This is a complete list of all 1851 Statutory Instruments published in the United Kingdom in the year 1994.


1-100

 Public Telecommunication System Designation (Vodafone Limited) Order 1994 (S.I. 1994/1)
 Oxfordshire County Council (Shifford Island Footbridge) Scheme 1993 Confirmation Instrument 1994 (S.I. 1994/12)
 Road Vehicles (Construction and Use) (Amendment) Regulations 1994 (S.I. 1994/14)
 Local Government Act 1988 (Defined Activities) (Exemption) (Harlow District Council) Order 1994 (S.I. 1994/15)
 Anglian Harbours National Health Service Trust (Transfer of Trust Property) Order 1994 (S.I. 1994/22)
 Brighton Health Care National Health Service Trust (Transfer of Trust Property) Order 1994 (S.I. 1994/23)
 Burnley Health Care National Health Service Trust (Transfer of Trust Property) Order 1994 (S.I. 1994/24)
 Cleveland Ambulance National Health Service Trust (Transfer of Trust Property) Order 1994 (S.I. 1994/25)
 Plymouth Community Services National Health Service Trust (Transfer of Trust Property) Order 1994 (S.I. 1994/26)
 South Downs Health National Health Service Trust (Transfer of Trust Property) Order 1994 (S.I. 1994/27)
 Birmingham City Council (Birmingham and Fazeley Canal Bridge) Scheme 1992 Confirmation Instrument 1994 (S.I. 1994/28)
 Cornwall and Isles of Scilly Learning Disabilities National Health Service Trust (Transfer of Trust Property) Order 1994 (S.I. 1994/29)
 Doncaster Healthcare National Health Service Trust (Transfer of Trust Property) Order 1994 (S.I. 1994/30)
 Forest Healthcare National Health Service Trust (Transfer of Trust Property) Order 1994 (S.I. 1994/31)
 Freeman Group of Hospitals National Health Service Trust (Transfer of Trust Property) Order 1994 (S.I. 1994/32)
 Frenchay Healthcare National Health Service Trust (Transfer of Trust Property) Order 1994 (S.I. 1994/33)
 James Paget Hospital National Health Service Trust (Transfer of Trust Property) Order 1994 (S.I. 1994/34)
 North Hertfordshire National Health Service Trust (Transfer of Trust Property) Order 1994 (S.I. 1994/35)
 Westcountry Ambulance Service National Health Service Trust (Transfer of Trust Property) Order 1994 (S.I. 1994/36)
 Local Authorities (Goods and Services) (Public Bodies) Order 1994 (S.I. 1994/37)
 Housing (Welfare Services) Order 1994 (S.I. 1994/42)
 A406 Trunk Road (Golders Green Road/Brent Street Junction Improvement, Trunk Road) Order 1994 (S.I. 1994/43)
 Food Protection (Emergency Prohibitions) (Radioactivity in Sheep) Partial Revocation Order 1994 (S.I. 1994/50)
 Calderstones National Health Service Trust (Transfer of Trust Property) Order 1994 (S.I. 1994/51)
 Phoenix National Health Service Trust (Transfer of Trust Property) Order 1994 (S.I. 1994/52)
 Rugby National Health Service Trust (Transfer of Trust Property) Order 1994 (S.I. 1994/53)
 South Tees Acute Hospitals National Health Service Trust (Transfer of Trust Property) Order 1994 (S.I. 1994/54)
 York Health Services National Health Service Trust (Transfer of Trust Property) Order 1994 (S.I. 1994/55)
 Frimley Park Hospital National Health Service Trust (Transfer of Trust Property) Order 1994 (S.I. 1994/59)
 Homewood National Health Service Trust (Transfer of Trust Property) Order 1994 (S.I. 1994/60)
 Phoenix National Health Service Trust (Transfer of Trust Property) (No. 2) Order 1994 (S.I. 1994/61)
 St Helens and Knowsley Community Health National Health Service Trust (Transfer of Trust Property) Order 1994 (S.I. 1994/62)
 Food Protection (Emergency Prohibitions) (Radioactivity in Sheep) (Wales) (Partial Revocation) Order 1994 (S.I. 1994/63)
 Non-Domestic Rates (Scotland) Order 1994 (S.I. 1994/64)
 Food Protection (Emergency Prohibitions) (Radioactivity in Sheep) (England) (Partial Revocation) Order 1994 (S.I. 1994/65)
 Chorley (Parishes) Order 1994 (S.I. 1994/67)
 General Optical Council (Testing of Sight by Persons Training as Ophthalmic Opticians Rules) Order of Council 1994 (S.I. 1994/70)
 Criminal Justice Act 1993 (Commencement No. 4) Order 1994 (S.I. 1994/71)
 Merger References (Increase in Value of Assets) Order 1994 (S.I. 1994/72)
 Water Enterprises (Merger) (Modification) Regulations 1994 (S.I. 1994/73)
 Road Traffic Act 1991 (Commencement No. 10 and Transitional Provisions) Order 1994 (S.I. 1994/81)
 Road Traffic (Special Parking Areas) (London Boroughs of Richmond upon Thames and Southwark) (Amendment) Order 1994 (S.I. 1994/82)
 European Parliamentary Elections (Day of Election) Order 1994 (S.I. 1994/83)
 Chappel and Wakes Colne Light Railway Order 1994 (S.I. 1994/84)
 Pension Schemes Act 1993 (Commencement No. 1) Order 1994 (S.I. 1994/86)
 Finance Act 1989, section 152, (Appointed Day) Order 1994 (S.I. 1994/87)
 Hill Livestock (Compensatory Allowances) (Amendment) Regulations 1994 (S.I. 1994/94)

101-200

 Medicines Act 1968 (Amendment) Regulations 1994 (S.I. 1994/101)
 Medicines (Advisory Board on the Registration of Homoeopathic Products) Order 1994 (S.I. 1994/102)
 Medicines (Standard Provisions for Licences and Certificates) Amendment Regulations 1994 (S.I. 1994/103)
 Medicines (Labelling and Leaflets) Amendment Regulations 1994 (S.I. 1994/104)
 Medicines (Homoeopathic Medicinal Products for Human Use) Regulations 1994 (S.I. 1994/105)
 Housing Revenue Account General Fund Contribution Limits (Scotland) Order 1994 (S.I. 1994/106)
 Glasgow Community and Mental Health Services National Health Service Trust (Change of Name) (Establishment) Amendment Order 1994 (S.I. 1994/107)
 London-Holyhead Trunk Road (Gwalchmai By-Pass) (Revocation) Order 1994 (S.I. 1994/108)
 Race Relations (Prescribed Public Bodies) Regulations 1994 (S.I. 1994/109)
 A18 Trunk Road (Junction 5, M180 Motorway) (Detrunking) Order 1994 (S.I. 1994/110)
 Salmon (Definition of Methods of Net Fishing and Construction of Nets) (Scotland) Amendment Regulations 1994 (S.I. 1994/111)
 Welsh Language Act 1993 (Commencement) Order 1994 (S.I. 1994/115)
 Driving Licences (Designation of Relevant External Law) Order 1994 (S.I. 1994/116)
 Companies (Welsh Language Forms and Documents) Regulations 1994 (S.I. 1994/117)
 Control of Industrial Major Accident Hazards (Amendment) Regulations 1994 (S.I. 1994/118)
 Criminal Justice Act 1988 (Reviews of Sentencing) Order 1994 (S.I. 1994/119)
 Fertilisers (Sampling and Analysis) (Amendment) Regulations 1994 (S.I. 1994/129)
 Cardiff and Vale of Glamorgan (Areas) Order 1994 (S.I. 1994/130)
 National Health Service (Optical Charges and Payments) Amendment Regulations 1994 (S.I. 1994/131)
 Friendly Societies (Auditors) Order 1994 (S.I. 1994/132)
 Secure Tenants of Local Housing Authorities (Right to Repair) Regulations 1994 (S.I. 1994/133)
 A23 Trunk Road (Brighton Road, Croydon) (Prohibition of Right Turn and U-Turn) Order 1994 (S.I. 1994/134)
 Council Tax (Transitional Reduction Scheme) (England) Regulations 1994 (S.I. 1994/135)
 European Communities (Iron and Steel Employees Re-adaptation Benefits Scheme) (No. 2) (Scheme Termination) Regulations 1994 (S.I. 1994/141)
 Vale of Glamorgan (Barry and Dinas Powys Communities) Order 1994 (S.I. 1994/142)
 Free Zone (Prestwick Airport) Designation (Variation) Order 1994 (S.I. 1994/143)
 Free Zone (Humberside) Designation Order 1994 (S.I. 1994/144)
 National Health Service (Optical Charges and Payments) (Scotland) Amendment Regulations 1994 (S.I. 1994/145)
 Education (Grant) (Henrietta Barnett School) Regulations 1994 (S.I. 1994/156)
 Railways and Other Transport Systems (Approval of Works, Plant and Equipment) Regulations 1994 (S.I. 1994/157)
 Industrial Training Levy (Engineering Construction Board) Order 1994 (S.I. 1994/158)
 Industrial Training Levy (Construction Board) Order 1994 (S.I. 1994/159)
 Dairy Produce Quotas (Amendment) Regulations 1994 (S.I. 1994/160)
 South Manchester University Hospitals National Health Service Trust (Establishment) Order 1994 (S.I. 1994/161)
 Dudley Priority Health National Health Service Trust (Establishment) Order 1994 (S.I. 1994/162)
 Kent and Sussex Weald National Health Service Trust (Establishment) Order 1994 (S.I. 1994/163)
 Salford Hospitals National Health Service Trust (Establishment) Order 1994 (S.I. 1994/164)
 Mid–Sussex National Health Service Trust (Establishment) Order 1994 (S.I. 1994/165)
 Royal West Sussex National Health Service Trust (Establishment) Order 1994 (S.I. 1994/166)
 Dorset Community National Health Service Trust (Establishment) Order 1994 (S.I. 1994/167)
 Dudley Group of Hospitals National Health Service Trust (Establishment) Order 1994 (S.I. 1994/168)
 Alexandra Health Care National Health Service Trust (Establishment) Order 1994 (S.I. 1994/169)
 Coventry Healthcare National Health Service Trust (Establishment) Order 1994 (S.I. 1994/170)
 South Birmingham Mental Health National Health Service Trust (Establishment) Order 1994 (S.I. 1994/171)
 Sandwell Healthcare National Health Service Trust (Establishment) Order 1994 (S.I. 1994/172)
 Northern Birmingham Mental Health National Health Service Trust (Establishment) Order 1994 (S.I. 1994/173)
 Weald of Kent Community National Health Service Trust (Establishment) Order 1994 (S.I. 1994/174)
 South Kent Hospitals National Health Service Trust (Establishment) Order 1994 (S.I. 1994/175)
 Norfolk and Norwich Health Care National Health Service Trust (Establishment) Order 1994 (S.I. 1994/176)
 St. Albans and Hemel Hempstead National Health Service Trust (Establishment) Order 1994 (S.I. 1994/177)
 North Hampshire Hospitals National Health Service Trust (Establishment) Order 1994 (S.I. 1994/178)
 Furness Hospitals National Health Service Trust (Establishment) Order 1994 (S.I. 1994/179)
 Trafford Healthcare National Health Service Trust (Establishment) Order 1994 (S.I. 1994/180)
 East Surrey Learning Disability and Mental Health Service National Health Service Trust (Establishment) Order 1994 (S.I. 1994/181)
 Surrey Ambulance National Health Service Trust (Establishment) Order 1994 (S.I. 1994/182)
 Bexley Community Health National Health Service Trust (Establishment) Order 1994 (S.I. 1994/183)
 Heathlands Mental Health National Health Service Trust (Establishment) Order 1994 (S.I. 1994/184)
 Mancunian Community Health National Health Service Trust (Establishment) Order 1994 (S.I. 1994/185)
 Insider Dealing (Securities and Regulated Markets) Order 1994 (S.I. 1994/187)
 Traded Securities (Disclosure) Regulations 1994 (S.I. 1994/188)
 National Lottery Regulations 1994 (S.I. 1994/189)
 Community Health Care: North Durham National Health Service Trust (Establishment) Amendment Order 1994 (S.I. 1994/194)
 Northwick Park Hospital National Health Service Trust (Change of Name) Order 1994 (S.I. 1994/195)
 Gateshead Healthcare National Health Service Trust (Establishment) Order 1994 (S.I. 1994/196)
 Premier Health National Health Service Trust (Establishment) Order 1994 (S.I. 1994/197)
 Northgate and Prudhoe National Health Service Trust (Establishment) Order 1994 (S.I. 1994/198)
 Environmental Protection (Non-Refillable Refrigerant Containers) Regulations 1994 (S.I. 1994/199)
 New Town (East Kilbride) Winding Up (Variation) Order 1994 (S.I. 1994/200)

201-300

 Lyon Court and Office Fees (Variation) Order 1994 (S.I. 1994/201)
 Railways Act 1993 (Commencement No. 2) Order 1994 (S.I. 1994/202)
 Act of Sederunt (Solicitor's Right of Audience) 1994 (S.I. 1994/221)
 Education (Teachers) (Amendment) Regulations 1994 (S.I. 1994/222)
 Nuffield Orthopaedic Centre National Health Service Trust (Transfer of Trust Property) Order 1994 (S.I. 1994/223)
 Mid Essex Community Health National Health Service Trust (Transfer of Trust Property) Order 1994 (S.I. 1994/224)
 South Western Regional Health Authority (Transfer of Trust Property) Order 1994 (S.I. 1994/225)
 Walsall Community Health National Health Service Trust (Transfer of Trust Property) Order 1994 (S.I. 1994/226)
 Child Support (Miscellaneous Amendments and Transitional Provisions) Regulations 1994 (S.I. 1994/227)
 Legal Aid in Civil Proceedings (Remuneration) Regulations 1994 (S.I. 1994/228)
 Civil Legal Aid (General) (Amendment) Regulations 1994 (S.I. 1994/229)
 Legal Aid in Family Proceedings (Remuneration) (Amendment) Regulations 1994 (S.I. 1994/230)
 Batteries and Accumulators (Containing Dangerous Substances) Regulations 1994 (S.I. 1994/232)
 Companies Act 1985 (Bank Accounts) Regulations 1994 (S.I. 1994/233)
 Public Telecommunication System Designation (NYNEX CableComms Bury and Rochdale) Order 1994 (S.I. 1994/234)
 Distraint by Collectors (Fees, Costs and Charges) Regulations 1994 (S.I. 1994/236)
 Railways (Safety Case) Regulations 1994 (S.I. 1994/237)
 Environmentally Sensitive Areas (Clwydian Range) Designation Order 1994 (S.I. 1994/238)
 Environmentally Sensitive Areas (Preseli) Designation Order 1994 (S.I. 1994/239)
 Environmentally Sensitive Areas (Cambrian Mountains-Extension) Designation (Amendment) Order 1994 (S.I. 1994/240)
 Environmentally Sensitive Areas (Lleyn Peninsula) Designation (Amendment) Order 1994 (S.I. 1994/241)
 Criminal Justice Act 1993 (Commencement No. 5) Order 1994 (S.I. 1994/242)
 National Rivers Authority (Severn-Trent and Anglian Regional Flood Defence Committees Areas) (Boundaries) Order 1994 (S.I. 1994/245)
 Local Authorities (Alteration of Requisite Calculations and Funds) Regulations 1994 (S.I. 1994/246)
 Copyright (Certification of Licensing Scheme for Educational Recording of Broadcasts and Cable Programmes) (Educational Recording Agency Limited) (Amendment) Order 1994 (S.I. 1994/247)
 Agriculture Act 1986 (Amendment) Regulations 1994 (S.I. 1994/249)
 Lothian Region (Electoral Arrangements) Amendment Order 1994 (S.I. 1994/259)
 Wells and Walsingham Light Railway (Amendment) Order 1994 (S.I. 1994/260)
 Child Abduction and Custody (Parties to Conventions) (Amendment) Order 1994 (S.I. 1994/262)
 Copyright (Application to Other Countries) (Amendment) Order 1994 (S.I. 1994/263)
 Performances (Reciprocal Protection) (Convention Countries) Order 1994 (S.I. 1994/264)
 Trustee Investments (Additional Powers) Order 1994 (S.I. 1994/265)
 Housing (Change of Landlord) (Payment of Disposal Cost by Instalments) (Amendment) Regulations 1994 (S.I. 1994/266)
 Town and Country Planning (Simplified Planning Zones) (Amendment) Regulations 1994 (S.I. 1994/267)
 Social Security Benefit (Persons Abroad) Amendment Regulations 1994 (S.I. 1994/268)
 Conwy Mussel Fishery (Amendment) Regulations 1994 (S.I. 1994/275)
 Medicines Act 1968 (Amendment) (No. 2) Regulations 1994 (S.I. 1994/276)
 Education (Financial Delegation to Schools) (Mandatory Exceptions) Regulations 1994 (S.I. 1994/277)
 New Possibilities National Health Service Trust (Transfer of Trust Property) Order 1994 (S.I. 1994/278)
 Richmond, Twickenham and Roehampton Healthcare National Health Service Trust (Transfer of Trust Property) Order 1994 (S.I. 1994/279)
 Good Hope Hospital National Health Service Trust (Transfer of Trust Property) Order 1994 (S.I. 1994/280)
 Essex Rivers Healthcare National Health Service Trust (Transfer of Trust Property) Order 1994 (S.I. 1994/281)
 Milk Marketing Scheme (Substitution of Date of Revocation) Order 1994 (S.I. 1994/282)
 National Health Service (Functions of Family Health Services Authorities in London) Regulations 1994 (S.I. 1994/284)
 Land Charges Fees (Amendment) Rules 1994 (S.I. 1994/286)
 Land Charges (Amendment) Rules 1994 (S.I. 1994/287)
 Solicitors (Disciplinary Proceedings) Rules 1994 (S.I. 1994/288)
 Income Tax (Deposit-takers) (Interest Payments) (Amendment) Regulations 1994 (S.I. 1994/295)
 Income Tax (Building Societies) (Dividends and Interest) (Amendment) Regulations 1994 (S.I. 1994/296)
 Quick-frozen Foodstuffs (Amendment) Regulations 1994 (S.I. 1994/298)
 Railways (Safety Critical Work) Regulations 1994 (S.I. 1994/299)

301-400

 Veterinary Surgeons and Veterinary Practitioners (Registration) (Amendment) Regulations Order of Council 1994 (S.I. 1994/305)
 County Court (Amendment) Rules 1994 (S.I. 1994/306)
 Royal Hospital of St. Bartholomew, the Royal London Hospital and London Chest Hospital National Health Service Trust (Establishment) Order 1994 (S.I. 1994/307)
 Newham Healthcare National Health Service Trust (Establishment) Order 1994 (S.I. 1994/308)
 Tavistock and Portman National Health Service Trust (Establishment) Order 1994 (S.I. 1994/309)
 Alteration of Boundaries of the Newark Area and Upper Witham Internal Drainage Districts Order 1994 (S.I. 1994/310)
 Public Health (International Trains) Regulations 1994 (S.I. 1994/311)
 East Glamorgan National Health Service Trust (Establishment) Order 1994 (S.I. 1994/316)
 Morriston Hospital National Health Service Trust (Establishment) Order 1994 (S.I. 1994/317)
 Central Manchester National Health Service Trust (Transfer of Trust Property) Order 1994 (S.I. 1994/318)
 Education (School Financial Statements) (Prescribed Particulars etc.) Regulations 1994 (S.I. 1994/323)
 Inshore Fishing (Prohibition of Fishing and Fishing Methods) (Scotland) Amendment Order 1994 (S.I. 1994/326)
 Goods Vehicles (Plating and Testing) (Amendment) Regulations 1994 (S.I. 1994/328)
 Road Vehicles (Construction and Use) (Amendment) (No. 2) Regulations 1994 (S.I. 1994/329)
 Berkshire, Buckinghamshire and Surrey (County Boundaries) Order 1994 (S.I. 1994/330)
 Greater London and Surrey (County and London Borough Boundaries) Order 1994 (S.I. 1994/331)
 Local Government, Planning and Land Act 1980 (Competition) (Wales) Regulations 1994 (S.I. 1994/338)
 Local Government Act 1988 (Defined Activities) (Exemptions) (Wales) Order 1994 (S.I. 1994/339)
 Financial Services (Disclosure of Information) (Designated Authorities) (No. 8) Order 1994 (S.I. 1994/340)
 Industrial and Provident Societies (Increase in Shareholding Limit) Order 1994 (S.I. 1994/341)
 European Parliamentary Elections (Changes to the Franchise and Qualification of Representatives) Regulations 1994 (S.I. 1994/342)
 Savings Certificates (Amendment) Regulations 1994 (S.I. 1994/343)
 Superannuation (Children's Pensions) (Earnings Limit) Order 1994 (S.I. 1994/350)
 Self-Governing Schools (Application and Amendment of Regulations) (Scotland) Regulations 1994 (S.I. 1994/351)
 North West London Mental Health National Health Service Trust (Transfer of Trust Property) Order 1994 (S.I. 1994/358)
 Central Middlesex Hospital National Health Service Trust (Transfer of Trust Property) Order 1994 (S.I. 1994/359)
 Parkside National Health Service Trust (Transfer of Trust Property) Order 1994 (S.I. 1994/360)
 Patent Agents (Mixed Partnerships and Bodies Corporate) Rules 1994 (S.I. 1994/362)
 Registered Trade Mark Agents (Mixed Partnerships and Bodies Corporate) Rules 1994 (S.I. 1994/363)
 Docklands Light Railway (Penalty Fares and Provision of Police Services) Order 1994 (S.I. 1994/371)
 Offshore Installations (Safety Zones) Order 1994 (S.I. 1994/372)
 Act of Sederunt (Fees of Messengers-at-Arms) 1994 (S.I. 1994/391)
 Act of Sederunt (Fees of Sheriff Officers) 1994 (S.I. 1994/392)
 Health and Safety (Fees) Regulations 1994 (S.I. 1994/397)
 Planning and Compensation Act 1991 (Commencement No. 16) (Scotland) Order 1994 (S.I. 1994/398)
 Great Ormond Street Hospital for Children National Health Service Trust (Establishment) Order 1994 (S.I. 1994/400)

401-500

 Royal Marsden National Health Service Trust (Establishment) Order 1994 (S.I. 1994/401)
 Royal Brompton Hospital National Health Service Trust (Establishment) Order 1994 (S.I. 1994/402)
 Moorfields Eye Hospital National Health Service Trust (Establishment) Order 1994 (S.I. 1994/403)
 Bethlem and Maudsley National Health Service Trust (Establishment) Order 1994 (S.I. 1994/404)
 National Health Service Trusts (Originating Capital Debt) Order 1994 (S.I. 1994/405)
 Sugar Beet (Research and Education) Order 1994 (S.I. 1994/407)
 Non–Domestic Rating (Demand Notices) (Wales) (Amendment) Regulations 1994 (S.I. 1994/415)
 Redundancy Payments (Local Government) (Modification) (Amendment) Order 1994 (S.I. 1994/417)
 Non-Domestic Rating Contributions (England) (Amendment) Regulations 1994 (S.I. 1994/421)
 Merchant Shipping (Ro-Ro Passenger Ship Survivability) Regulations 1994 (S.I. 1994/422)
 Biotechnology and Biological Sciences Research Council Order 1994 (S.I. 1994/423)
 Engineering and Physical Sciences Research Council Order 1994 (S.I. 1994/424)
 Particle Physics and Astronomy Research Council Order 1994 (S.I. 1994/425)
 Airports (Northern Ireland) Order 1994 (S.I. 1994/426)
 European Parliamentary Constituencies (England) Order 1994 (S.I. 1994/427)
 European Parliamentary Constituencies (Wales) Order 1994 (S.I. 1994/428)
 Health and Personal Social Services (Northern Ireland) Order 1994 (S.I. 1994/429)
 Housing Support Grant (Scotland) Order 1994 (S.I. 1994/430)
 Self-Governing Schools Grant and Recovery (Scotland) Regulations 1994 (S.I. 1994/431)
 Hyde Park and The Regent's Park (Vehicle Parking) Regulations 1994 (S.I. 1994/432)
 Housing Renovation etc. Grants (Prescribed Forms and Particulars) (Welsh Forms and Particulars) (Amendment) Regulations 1994 (S.I. 1994/435)
 Education Act 1993 (Commencement No. 2 and Transitional Provisions) (Amendment) Order 1994 (S.I. 1994/436)
 Ozone Monitoring and Information Regulations 1994 (S.I. 1994/440)
 Railways Act 1993 (Commencement No. 3) Order 1994 (S.I. 1994/447)
 Auditors (Insurance Companies Act 1982) Regulations 1994 (S.I. 1994/449)
 Textile Products (Indications of Fibre Content) (Amendment) Regulations 1994 (S.I. 1994/450)
 Sea Fishing (Enforcement of Community Control Measures) Order 1994 (S.I. 1994/451)
 Sea Fish (Marketing Standards) (Amendment) Regulations 1994 (S.I. 1994/452)
 Broadcasting (Foreign Satellite Programmes) (Specified Countries) Order 1994 (S.I. 1994/453)
 Broadcasting (Prescribed Countries) Order 1994 (S.I. 1994/454)
 Acquisition of Land (Rate of Interest after Entry) Regulations 1994 (S.I. 1994/468)
 Acquisition of Land (Rate of Interest after Entry) (Scotland) Regulations 1994 (S.I. 1994/469)
 Housing Benefit and Council Tax Benefit (Amendment) Regulations 1994 (S.I. 1994/470)
 Combined Probation Areas (Greater Manchester) Order 1994 (S.I. 1994/471)
 Marek's Disease (Restriction on Vaccination) (Revocation) Order 1994 (S.I. 1994/472)
 Combined Probation Areas (Buckinghamshire) Order 1994 (S.I. 1994/473)
 Self-Governing Schools (Change in Characteristics) (Scotland) Regulations 1994 (S.I. 1994/478)
 Avalon, Somerset, National Health Service Trust (Transfer of Trust Property) Order 1994 (S.I. 1994/481)
 Churchill John Radcliffe National Health Service Trust (Change of Name) Order 1994 (S.I. 1994/482)
 South Bedfordshire Community Health Care National Health Service Trust (Transfer of Trust Property) Order 1994 (S.I. 1994/483)
 Barnsley District General Hospital National Health Service Trust (Transfer of Trust Property) Order 1994 (S.I. 1994/484)
 Merton and Sutton Community National Health Service Trust (Transfer of Trust Property) Order 1994 (S.I. 1994/485)
 Luton and Dunstable Hospital Trust National Health Service Trust (Transfer of Trust Property) Order 1994 (S.I. 1994/486)
 Royal Devon and Exeter Healthcare National Health Service Trust (Transfer of Trust Property) Order 1994 (S.I. 1994/487)
 Mid-Staffordshire General Hospitals National Health Service Trust (Transfer of Trust Property) Order 1994 (S.I. 1994/488)
 Humberside Ambulance Service National Health Service Trust (Transfer of Trust Property) Order 1994 (S.I. 1994/489)
 North Yorkshire Ambulance Service National Health Service Trust (Transfer of Trust Property) Order 1994 (S.I. 1994/490)
 Southampton University Hospitals National Health Service Trust (Transfer of Trust Property) Order 1994 (S.I. 1994/491)
 South Yorkshire Metropolitan Ambulance and Paramedic Service National Health Service Trust (Transfer of Trust Property) Order 1994 (S.I. 1994/492)
 Royal Hull Hospitals National Health Service Trust (Transfer of Trust Property) Order 1994 (S.I. 1994/493)
 Huddersfield Health Care Services National Health Service Trust (Transfer of Trust Property) Order 1994 (S.I. 1994/494)
 National Health Service (Optical Charges and Payments) Amendment (No. 2) Regulations 1994 (S.I. 1994/495)
 National Health Service Trusts (Originating Capital Debt) (Scotland) Order 1994 (S.I. 1994/496)
 Lands Tribunal for Scotland (Amendment) (Fees) Rules 1994 (S.I. 1994/497)
 Scottish Land Court (Fees) Order 1994 (S.I. 1994/498)
 Feeding Stuffs (Amendment) Regulations 1994 (S.I. 1994/499)
 Guaranteed Minimum Pensions Increase Order 1994 (S.I. 1994/500)

501-600

 Return of Cultural Objects Regulations 1994 S.I. 1994/501
 Merchant Shipping (Fees) (Amendment) Regulations 1994 S.I. 1994/502
 Civil Aviation (Navigation Services Charges) (Fourth Amendment) Regulations 1994 S.I. 1994/503
 Community Charges (Administration and Enforcement) (Amendment) Regulations 1994 S.I. 1994/504
 Council Tax (Administration and Enforcement) (Amendment) Regulations 1994 S.I. 1994/505
 Social Fund Maternity and Funeral Expenses (General) Amendment Regulations 1994 S.I. 1994/506
 Education Act 1993 (Commencement No. 3 and Transitional Provisions) Order 1994 S.I. 1994/507
 National Health Service Trusts (Appointment of Trustees) (Scotland) Order 1994 S.I. 1994/510
 Employers' Liability (Compulsory Insurance) Exemption (Amendment) Regulations 1994 S.I. 1994/520
 Environmental Protection (Waste Recycling Payments) (Amendment) Regulations 1994 S.I. 1994/522
 Housing Benefit and Council Tax Benefit (Subsidy) Order 1994 S.I. 1994/523
 Accountants (Banking Act 1987) Regulations 1994 S.I. 1994/524
 Building Societies (Auditors) Order 1994 S.I. 1994/525
 Auditors (Financial Services Act 1986) Rules 1994 S.I. 1994/526
 Income-related Benefits Schemes (Miscellaneous Amendments) Regulations 1994 S.I. 1994/527
 Local Government Finance (Scotland) Order 1994 S.I. 1994/528
 Revenue Support Grant (Scotland) Order 1994 S.I. 1994/529
 National Health Service (Dental Charges) Amendment Regulations 1994 S.I. 1994/530
 Local Government Superannuation (Scotland) Amendment Regulations 1994 S.I. 1994/531
 Electricity Supply (Amendment) Regulations 1994 S.I. 1994/533
 Export of Goods (Control) (Amendment No 7) Order 1994 S.I. 1994/534
 Misuse of Drugs (Licence Fees) (Amendment) Regulations 1994 S.I. 1994/535
 Industrial Tribunals (Constitution and Rules of Procedure) (Amendment) Regulations 1994 S.I. 1994/536
 Education (Particulars of Independent Schools) (Amendment) Regulations 1994 S.I. 1994/537
 Industrial Tribunals (Constitution and Rules of Procedure) (Scotland) (Amendment) Regulations 1994 S.I. 1994/538
 Council Tax (Exempt Dwellings) (Amendment) Order 1994 S.I. 1994/539
 Council Tax (Additional Provisions for Discount Disregards) (Amendment) Regulations 1994 S.I. 1994/540
 Merchant Shipping (Registration of Ships) (Amendment) Regulations 1994 S.I. 1994/541
 Social Security Benefits Up-rating Order 1994 S.I. 1994/542
 Council Tax (Discount Disregards) (Amendment) Order 1994 S.I. 1994/543
 Social Security (Contributions) (Re-rating and National Insurance Fund Payments) Order 1994 S.I. 1994/544
 National Health Service Act 1977 (Composition of Medical Practices Committee) Modification Order 1994 S.I. 1994/545
 Certification Officer (Amendment of Fees) Regulations 1994 S.I. 1994/546
 Non-Domestic Rating Contributions (Wales) (Amendment) Regulations 1994 S.I. 1994/547
 Home Purchase Assistance (Commutation of Repayments) Order 1994 S.I. 1994/548
 City of Stoke-on-Trent (Downfields Canal Bridge) Scheme, 1993 Confirmation Instrument 1994 S.I. 1994/551
 Local Authorities (Capital Finance) (Amendment) Regulations 1994 S.I. 1994/553
 Motor Cars (Driving Instruction) (Amendment) Regulations 1994 S.I. 1994/554
 Agricultural Training Board (Revocation) Order 1994 S.I. 1994/555
 British Citizenship (Designated Service) (Amendment) Order 1994 S.I. 1994/556
 Warrington (Parishes) Order 1994 S.I. 1994/557
 Medicines (Products Other Than Veterinary Drugs) (Prescription Only) Amendment Order 1994 S.I. 1994/558
 Social Security Benefits Up-rating Regulations 1994 S.I. 1994/559
 Local Authorities (Capital Finance) (Rate of Discount for 1994/95) Regulations 1994 S.I. 1994/560
 Statutory Sick Pay (Small Employers' Relief) Amendment Regulations 1994 S.I. 1994/561
 Statutory Sick Pay (Rate of Payment) Order 1994 S.I. 1994/562
 Social Security (Contributions) Amendment Regulations 1994 S.I. 1994/563
 Birmingham City Council, (Birmingham and Fazeley Canal Bridge) Scheme 1990 Confirmation Instrument 1994 S.I. 1994/564
 Housing Renovation etc. Grants (Prescribed Forms and Particulars) Regulations 1994 S.I. 1994/565
 Castle Vale Housing Action Trust (Transfer of Property) Order 1994 S.I. 1994/566
 Local Government (Direct Labour Organisations) (Competition) (Exemption) (England) Regulations 1994 S.I. 1994/567
 Rent Officers (Additional Functions) (Amendment) Order 1994 S.I. 1994/568
 Local Government Act 1988 (Defined Activities) (Exemption) (England) Order 1994 S.I. 1994/569
 Channel Tunnel (Security) Order 1994 S.I. 1994/570
 Railways Act 1993 (Commencement No. 4 and Transitional Provision) Order 1994 S.I. 1994/571
 Railways (Licence Application) Regulations 1994 S.I. 1994/572
 Railways (London Regional Transport) (Exemptions) Order 1994 S.I. 1994/573
 Railways (Heathrow Express) (Exemptions) Order 1994 S.I. 1994/574
 Railways (Registers) Order 1994 S.I. 1994/575
 Railways (Penalty Fares) Regulations 1994 S.I. 1994/576
 British Railways (Penalty Fares) Act 1989 (Revocation of Activating Orders) Order 1994 S.I. 1994/577
 Housing Benefit and Council Tax Benefit (Miscellaneous Amendments) Regulations 1994 S.I. 1994/578
 Housing Benefit (Permitted Totals) Order 1994 S.I. 1994/579
 Education (London Residuary Body) (Transfer of Property etc.) Order 1994 S.I. 1994/580
 Education (Middle Schools) (Amendment) Regulations 1994 S.I. 1994/581
 Rent Officers (Additional Functions) (Scotland) Amendment Order 1994 S.I. 1994/582
 National Board for Nursing, Midwifery and Health Visiting for England (Constitution and Administration) Amendment Order 1994 (S.I. 1994/586)
 National Blood Authority (Establishment and Constitution) Amendment Order 1994 (S.I. 1994/589)
 National Health Service Functions (Directions to Authorities and Administration Arrangements) Amendment Regulations 1994 (S.I. 1994/590)
 Statutory Maternity Pay (Compensation of Employers) Amendment Regulations 1994 (S.I. 1994/592)
 Wireless Telegraphy (Television Licence Fees) (Amendment) Regulations 1994 (S.I. 1994/595)
 Medicines (Veterinary Drugs) (Pharmacy and Merchants' List) (Amendment) Order 1994 (S.I. 1994/599)
 Crown Office Fees Order 1994 (S.I. 1994/600)

601-700

 Enrolment of Deeds (Fees) Regulations 1994 (S.I. 1994/601)
 Microbiological Research Authority Regulations 1994 (S.I. 1994/602)
 Microbiological Research Authority (Establishment and Constitution) Order 1994 (S.I. 1994/603)
 Enrolment of Deeds (Change of Name) Regulations 1994 (S.I. 1994/604)
 Railways (Class and Miscellaneous Exemptions) Order 1994 (S.I. 1994/606)
 Railways (Alternative Closure Procedure) Order 1994 (S.I. 1994/607)
 Railways (Amendment) Regulations 1994 (S.I. 1994/608)
 British Transport Police Force Scheme 1963 (Amendment) Order 1994 (S.I. 1994/609)
 Education (Grant-maintained Schools) (Finance) (Wales) Regulations 1994 (S.I. 1994/610)
 Research Councils (Transfer of Property etc.) Order 1994 (S.I. 1994/611)
 Education (Grants for Education Support and Training) Regulations 1994 (S.I. 1994/612)
 Secure Tenants of Local Authorities (Compensation for Improvements) Regulations 1994 (S.I. 1994/613)
 Local Authorities (Members' Allowances) (Amendment) Regulations 1994 (S.I. 1994/615)
 Motor Vehicles (EC Type Approval) (Amendment) Regulations 1994 (S.I. 1994/617)
 Thanet Health Care National Health Service Trust (Transfer of Trust Property) Order 1994 (S.I. 1994/619)
 Canterbury and Thanet Community Healthcare National Health Service Trust (Transfer of Trust Property) Order 1994 (S.I. 1994/620)
 West Lindsey National Health Service Trust (Transfer of Trust Property) Order 1994 (S.I. 1994/621)
 Mancunian Community Health National Health Service Trust (Transfer of Trust Property) Order 1994 (S.I. 1994/622)
 Hillingdon Hospital National Health Service Trust (Transfer of Trust Property) Order 1994 (S.I. 1994/623)
 Andover District Community Health Care National Health Service Trust (Transfer of Trust Property) Order 1994 (S.I. 1994/624)
 South Tees Community and Mental Health National Health Service Trust (Transfer of Trust Property) Order 1994 (S.I. 1994/625)
 Council Tax (Discounts) (Scotland) Amendment Order 1994 (S.I. 1994/626)
 Housing (Right to Manage) Regulations 1994 (S.I. 1994/627)
 Council Tax (Exempt Dwellings) (Scotland) Amendment Order 1994 (S.I. 1994/628)
 Council Tax (Discounts) (Scotland) Amendment Regulations 1994 (S.I. 1994/629)
 Local Authorities Etc. (Allowances) (Scotland) Amendment Regulations 1994 (S.I. 1994/630)
 PARLIAMENT S.I. 1994/631)
 Secure Tenants (Compensation for Improvements) (Scotland) Regulations 1994 (S.I. 1994/632)
 National Health Service (General Medical Services) Amendment Regulations 1994 (S.I. 1994/633)
 National Health Service (Service Committees and Tribunal) Amendment Regulations 1994 (S.I. 1994/634)
 National Health Service (Optical Charges and Payments) (Scotland) Amendment (No.2) Regulations 1994 (S.I. 1994/635)
 National Health Service (Dental Charges) (Scotland) Amendment Regulations 1994 (S.I. 1994/636)
 Home Energy Efficiency Grants (Amendment) Regulations 1994 (S.I. 1994/637)
 Motor Vehicles (Driving Licences) (Amendment) Regulations 1994 (S.I. 1994/638)
 Motor Vehicles (Driving Licences) (Large Goods and Passenger-Carrying Vehicles) (Amendment) Regulations 1994 (S.I. 1994/639)
 National Health Service (Fund-holding Practices) Amendment Regulations 1994 (S.I. 1994/640)
 Police Pensions (Amendment) Regulations 1994 (S.I. 1994/641)
 Fees for Inquiries (Standard Daily Amount) Regulations 1994 (S.I. 1994/642)
 Insurance (Fees) Regulations 1994 (S.I. 1994/643)
 Partnerships (Unrestricted Size) No. 11 Regulations 1994 (S.I. 1994/644)
 Education (School Curriculum and Assessment Authority) (Transfer of Functions) Order 1994 (S.I. 1994/645)
 Education (National Curriculum) (Assessment Arrangements for English, Welsh, Mathematics and Science) (Key Stage 1) (Wales) (Amendment) Order 1994 (S.I. 1994/646)
 Education (National Curriculum) (Assessment Arrangements for English, Welsh, Mathematics and Science) (Key Stage 3) (Wales) (Amendment) Order 1994 (S.I. 1994/647)
 Housing Renovation etc. Grants (Reduction of Grant) Regulations 1994 (S.I. 1994/648)
 Education (Payment for Special Educational Needs Supplies) Regulations 1994 (S.I. 1994/650)
 Education (Special Educational Needs) (Approval of Independent Schools) Regulations 1994 (S.I. 1994/651)
 Education (Special Schools) Regulations 1994 (S.I. 1994/652)
 Education (Grant-maintained Special Schools) Regulations 1994 (S.I. 1994/653)
 Education (Governors of New Grant-maintained Schools) Regulations 1994 (S.I. 1994/654)
 Building Societies (EFTA States) Order 1994 (S.I. 1994/655)
 Building Societies (General Charge and Fees) Regulations 1994 (S.I. 1994/656)
 Friendly Societies (General Charge and Fees) (Amendment) Regulations 1994 (S.I. 1994/657)
 Industrial and Provident Societies (Credit Unions) (Amendment of Fees) Regulations 1994 (S.I. 1994/658)
 Wireless Telegraphy (Licence Charges) (Amendment) Regulations 1994 (S.I. 1994/659)
 Industrial and Provident Societies (Amendment of Fees) Regulations 1994 (S.I. 1994/660)
 Bedfordshire and Hertfordshire Ambulance and Paramedic Service National Health Service Trust (Transfer of Trust Property) Order 1994 (S.I. 1994/661)
 Bedford Hospital National Health Service Trust (Transfer of Trust Property) Order 1994 (S.I. 1994/662)
 Bedford and Shires Health and Care National Health Service Trust (Transfer of Trust Property) Order 1994 (S.I. 1994/663)
 Hampshire Ambulance Service National Health Service Trust (Transfer of Trust Property) Order 1994 (S.I. 1994/664)
 Kent and Canterbury Hospitals National Health Service Trust (Transfer of Trust Property) Order 1994 (S.I. 1994/665)
 Eastbourne and County Healthcare National Health Service Trust (Transfer of Trust Property) Order 1994 (S.I. 1994/666)
 Social Security (Contributions) (Miscellaneous Amendments) Regulations 1994 (S.I. 1994/667)
 Registered Housing Associations (Accounting Requirements) (Wales) Order 1994 (S.I. 1994/668)
 Carriage of Dangerous Goods by Road and Rail (Classification, Packaging and Labelling) Regulations 1994 (S.I. 1994/669)
 Carriage of Dangerous Goods by Rail Regulations 1994 (S.I. 1994/670)
 Workmen's Compensation (Supplementation) (Amendment) Scheme 1994 (S.I. 1994/671)
 Dairy Produce Quotas Regulations 1994 (S.I. 1994/672)
 Bovine Spongiform Encephalopathy Compensation Order 1994 (S.I. 1994/673)
 Common Agricultural Policy (Wine) Regulations 1994 (S.I. 1994/674)
 Plant Breeders~ Rights (Fees) (Amendment) Regulations 1994 (S.I. 1994/675)
 Seeds (National Lists of Varieties) (Fees) Regulations 1994 (S.I. 1994/676)
 Town and Country Planning (Assessment of Environmental Effects) (Amendment) Regulations 1994 (S.I. 1994/677)
 Town and Country Planning General Development (Amendment) Order 1994 (S.I. 1994/678)
 Mount Vernon Hospital National Health Service Trust (Transfer of Trust Property) Order 1994 (S.I. 1994/679)
 National Health Service (District Health Authorities) Order 1994 (S.I. 1994/680)
 National Health Service (Determination of Districts) Order 1994 (S.I. 1994/681)
 National Health Service (Regional and District Health Authorities) (Miscellaneous Amendments) Regulations 1994 (S.I. 1994/682)
 National Health Service (Determination of Regions) Order 1994 (S.I. 1994/683)
 National Health Service (Regional Health Authorities) Order 1994 (S.I. 1994/684)
 Milk Marketing Schemes (Substitution of Date of Revocation) (Scotland) Order 1994 (S.I. 1994/685)
 Value Added Tax (Tax Free Shops) Order 1994 (S.I. 1994/686)
 Value Added Tax (Sport, Physical Education and Fund-Raising Events) Order 1994 (S.I. 1994/687)
 Road Traffic (Special Parking Areas) (London Boroughs of Bromley, Hammersmith and Fulham and Lewisham) (Amendment) Order 1994 (S.I. 1994/689)
 National Health Service (Charges for Drugs and Appliances) Amendment Regulations 1994 (S.I. 1994/690)
 Bowes Extension Light Railway Order 1994 (S.I. 1994/691)
 Education (No. 2) Act 1986 (Amendment) Order 1994 (S.I. 1994/692)
 Housing Renovation etc. Grants (Prescribed Forms and Particulars) (Welsh Forms and Particulars) Regulations 1994 (S.I. 1994/693)
 Hydrocarbon Oil (Amendment) (No. 2) Regulations 1994 (S.I. 1994/694)
 Tower Hamlets Housing Action Trust (Transfer of Property) Order 1994 (S.I. 1994/695)
 Medicines (Products for Human Use—Fees) Amendment Regulations 1994 (S.I. 1994/696)
 National Health Service (Charges for Drugs and Appliances) (Scotland) Amendment Regulations 1994 (S.I. 1994/697)
 Criminal Justice Act 1993 (Commencement No. 6) Order 1994 (S.I. 1994/700)

701-800

 Greater Manchester (Light Rapid Transit System) (Modification) Order 1994 (S.I. 1994/701)
 London Regional Transport (Penalty Fares) Act 1992 (Activating No. 1) Order 1994 (S.I. 1994/702)
 Incumbents (Vacation of Benefices) Rules 1994 (S.I. 1994/703)
 Social Security Pensions (Home Responsibilities) Regulations 1994 (S.I. 1994/704)
 Civil Courts (Amendment) Order 1994 (S.I. 1994/706)
 Environmentally Sensitive Areas (Blackdown Hills) Designation Order 1994 (S.I. 1994/707)
 Environmentally Sensitive Areas (Cotswold Hills) Designation Order 1994 (S.I. 1994/708)
 Environmentally Sensitive Areas (Shropshire Hills) Designation Order 1994 (S.I. 1994/709)
 Environmentally Sensitive Areas (Dartmoor) Designation Order 1994 (S.I. 1994/710)
 Environmentally Sensitive Areas (Essex Coast) Designation Order 1994 (S.I. 1994/711)
 Environmentally Sensitive Areas (Upper Thames Tributaries) Designation Order 1994 (S.I. 1994/712)
 Public Trustee (Fees) (Amendment) Order 1994 (S.I. 1994/714)
 Personal Injuries (Civilians) Amendment Scheme 1994 (S.I. 1994/715)
 Education (Registered Inspectors of Schools Appeal Tribunal) (Procedure) Regulations 1994 (S.I. 1994/717)
 Transport and Works Act 1992 (Commencement No. 5 and Transitional Provisions) Order 1994 (S.I. 1994/718)
 National Rivers Authority (Alteration of Boundaries of the South Holland Internal Drainage District) Order 1993 S.I. 1994/723)
 Town and Country Planning (Use Classes) (Amendment) Order 1994 (S.I. 1994/724)
 Rent Act 1977 (Forms, etc.) (Welsh Forms and Particulars) (Amendment) Regulations 1994 (S.I. 1994/725)
 Social Security (Categorisation of Earners) Amendment Regulations 1994 (S.I. 1994/726)
 Rheoliadau (Ffurflenni a Dogfenni Cymraeg) Cwmn au (Diwygiad) 1994 (S.I. 1994/727)
 Lloyd's Underwriters (Tax) (1991–92)Regulations 1994 (S.I. 1994/728)
 General Optical Council (Registration and Enrolment (Amendment) Rules) Order of Council 1994 (S.I. 1994/729)
 Statutory Sick Pay Act 1994 (Consequential) Regulations 1994 (S.I. 1994/730)
 Child Support Act 1991 (Consequential Amendments) Order 1994 (S.I. 1994/731)
 Drinking Water in Containers Regulations 1994 (S.I. 1994/743)
 Telecommunications Act 1984 (Government Shareholding) Order 1994 (S.I. 1994/744)
 Mid Essex Community Health National Health Service Trust Dissolution Order 1994 (S.I. 1994/745)
 Representation of the People (Variation of Limits of Candidates' Election Expenses) Order 1994 (S.I. 1994/747)
 European Parliamentary Elections (Amendment) Regulations 1994 (S.I. 1994/748)
 Building Societies (Undated Subordinated Debt) Order 1994 (S.I. 1994/749)
 Building Societies (Designated Capital Resources) (Amendment) Order 1994 (S.I. 1994/750)
 European Communities (Designation) Order 1994 (S.I. 1994/757)
 European Communities (Definition of Treaties) (Europe Agreement establishing an Association between the European Communities and their Member States and the Republic of Bulgaria) Order 1994 (S.I. 1994/758)
 European Communities (Definition of Treaties) (Europe Agreement establishing an Association between the European Communities and their Member States and the Czech Republic) Order 1994 (S.I. 1994/759)
 European Communities (Definition of Treaties) (Europe Agreement establishing an Association between the European Communities and their Member States and Romania) Order 1994 (S.I. 1994/760)
 European Communities (Definition of Treaties) (Europe Agreement establishing an Association between the European Communities and their Member States and the Slovak Republic) Order 1994 (S.I. 1994/761)
 Appropriation (Northern Ireland) Order 1994 (S.I. 1994/762)
 Local Elections (Variation of Limits of Candidates' Election Expenses) (Northern Ireland) Order 1994 (S.I. 1994/763)
 Northern Ireland (Emergency Provisions) Act 1991 (Guernsey) Order 1994 (S.I. 1994/764)
 Social Security (Contributions) (Northern Ireland) Order 1994 (S.I. 1994/765)
 Statutory Sick Pay (Northern Ireland) Order 1994 (S.I. 1994/766)
 Double Taxation Relief (Air Transport) (Saudi Arabia) Order 1994 (S.I. 1994/767)
 Double Taxation Relief (Taxes on Income) (Austria) Order 1994 (S.I. 1994/768)
 Double Taxation Relief (Taxes on Income) (Indonesia) Order 1994 (S.I. 1994/769)
 Double Taxation Relief (Taxes on Income) (Uzbekistan) Order 1994 (S.I. 1994/770)
 Home Guard (Amendment) Order 1994 (S.I. 1994/771)
 Naval, Military and Air Forces etc. (Disablement and Death) Service Pensions Amendment Order 1994 (S.I. 1994/772)
 Ulster Defence Regiment (Amendment) Order 1994 (S.I. 1994/773)
 Merchant Shipping (Modification of Enactments) (Bareboat Charter Ships) Order 1994 (S.I. 1994/774)
 Income Tax (Employments) (Amendment) Regulations 1994 (S.I. 1994/775)
 Pensions Increase (Review) Order 1994 (S.I. 1994/776)
 Income Tax (Car Benefits) (Replacement Accessories) Regulations 1994 (S.I. 1994/777)
 Income Tax (Replacement Cars) Regulations 1994 (S.I. 1994/778)
 Education (Groups including Grant-maintained Special Schools) Regulations 1994 (S.I. 1994/779)
 Environmental Protection Act 1990 (Commencement No. 14) Order 1994 (S.I. 1994/780)
 Housing Benefit and Council Tax Benefit (Subsidy) Regulations 1994 (S.I. 1994/781)
 European Parliamentary Elections (Northern Ireland) (Amendment) Regulations 1994 (S.I. 1994/782)
 Medicines (Control of Substances for Manufacture and Exportation of Specified Products for Human Use) Amendment Order 1994 (S.I. 1994/787)
 Merchant Shipping (Seamen~s Wages and Accounts) (Amendment) Regulations 1994 (S.I. 1994/791)
 North Kent Healthcare National Health Service Trust (Establishment) Amendment Order 1994 (S.I. 1994/797)
 South Birmingham Community Health National Health Service Trust (Change of Name) Order 1994 (S.I. 1994/798)
 A564 Trunk Road (Stoke-Derby Route) (Derby Southern Bypass and Slip Road) (No. 3) Order 1994 (S.I. 1994/799)
 (M1) Motorway (Lockington) Connecting Roads Scheme 1994 (S.I. 1994/800)

801-900

 A564 Trunk Road (Stoke–Derby Route) (Derby Southern Bypass, Derby Spur, Junctions and Slip Roads) Amendment Order 1994 (S.I. 1994/801)
 A564 Trunk Road (Stoke–Derby Route) (Derby Southern Bypass) (Detrunking) (No. 2) Order 1994 (S.I. 1994/802)
 Value Added Tax (Accounting and Records) (Amendment) Regulations 1994 (S.I. 1994/803)
 Food Labelling (Amendment) Regulations 1994 (S.I. 1994/804)
 Legal Advice and Assistance (Amendment) Regulations 1994 (S.I. 1994/805)
 Civil Legal Aid (Assessment of Resources) (Amendment) Regulations 1994 (S.I. 1994/806)
 Legal Aid in Criminal and Care Proceedings (General) (Amendment) Regulations 1994 (S.I. 1994/807)
 Family Proceedings (Amendment) Rules 1994 (S.I. 1994/808)
 Family Proceedings Courts (Miscellaneous Amendments) Rules 1994 (S.I. 1994/809)
 Borders Regional Council (Galashiels Mill Lade) (Amendment) Water Order 1994 (S.I. 1994/810)
 Tees and Hartlepool Port Authority (Dissolution) Order 1994 (S.I. 1994/818)
 National Assistance (Assessment of Resources) (Amendment) Regulations 1994 (S.I. 1994/825)
 National Assistance (Sums for Personal Requirements) Regulations 1994 (S.I. 1994/826)
 Gateshead Community Health National Health Service Trust Dissolution Order 1994 (S.I. 1994/827)
 Mancunian Community Health National Health Service Trust Dissolution Order 1994 (S.I. 1994/828)
 Northgate National Health Service Trust Dissolution Order 1994 (S.I. 1994/829)
 Royal London Hospital and Associated Community Services National Health Service Trust Dissolution Order 1994 (S.I. 1994/830)
 West Dorset Mental Health National Health Service Trust Dissolution Order 1994 (S.I. 1994/831)
 Premier Health National Health Service Trust Dissolution Order 1994 (S.I. 1994/832)
 West Dorset Community Health National Health Service Trust Dissolution Order 1994 (S.I. 1994/833)
 Non-Domestic Rating (Railways) and Central Rating Lists (Amendment) Regulations 1994 (S.I. 1994/834)
 Prevention of Terrorism (Temporary Provisions) Act 1989 (Continuance) Order 1994 (S.I. 1994/835)
 Secure Tenants of Local Housing Authorities (Right to Repair) (Amendment) Regulations 1994 (S.I. 1994/844)
 Harrow and Hillingdon Healthcare National Health Service Trust (Establishment) Order 1994 (S.I. 1994/848)
 Royal Victoria Infirmary and Associated Hospitals National Health Service Trust (Establishment) Order 1994 (S.I. 1994/849)
 University College London Hospitals National Health Service Trust (Establishment) Order 1994 (S.I. 1994/850)
 Newcastle City Health National Health Service Trust (Establishment) Order 1994 (S.I. 1994/851)
 Mount Vernon and Watford Hospitals National Health Service Trust (Establishment) Order 1994 (S.I. 1994/852)
 Hammersmith Hospitals National Health Service Trust (Establishment) Order 1994 (S.I. 1994/853)
 West Herts Community Health National Health Service Trust (Establishment) Order 1994 (S.I. 1994/854)
 Chelsea and Westminster Healthcare National Health Service Trust (Establishment) Order 1994 (S.I. 1994/855)
 South East London Mental Health National Health Service Trust (Change of Name and Miscellaneous Amendments) Order 1994 (S.I. 1994/856)
 Railways Act 1993 (Consequential Modifications) Order 1994 (S.I. 1994/857)
 Harrow Community Health Services National Health Service Trust Dissolution Order 1994 (S.I. 1994/858)
 Royal Victoria Infirmary and Associated Hospitals National Health Service Trust Dissolution Order 1994 (S.I. 1994/859)
 Mount Vernon Hospital National Health Service Trust Dissolution Order 1994 (S.I. 1994/860)
 Newcastle Mental Health National Health Service Trust Dissolution Order 1994 (S.I. 1994/861)
 Dacorum and St Albans Community National Health Service Trust Dissolution Order 1994 (S.I. 1994/862)
 Hillingdon Community Health National Health Service Trust Dissolution Order 1994 (S.I. 1994/863)
 Local Government Changes for England Regulations 1994 (S.I. 1994/867)
 Public Telecommunication System Designation (Encom Cable TV & Telecommunications Limited) (Dartford) Order 1994 (S.I. 1994/874)
 Public Telecommunication System Designation (Encom Cable TV & Telecommunications Limited) (Epping Forest) Order 1994 (S.I. 1994/875)
 Public Telecommunication System Designation (NYNEX CableComms Oldham and Tameside) Order 1994 (S.I. 1994/876)
 National Health Service (General Medical and Pharmaceutical Services) (Scotland) Amendment Regulations 1994 (S.I. 1994/884)
 European Parliamentary Elections (Returning Officers) (England and Wales) Order 1994 (S.I. 1994/894)
 Occupational Pension Schemes (Deficiency on Winding Up etc.) Regulations 1994 (S.I. 1994/895)
 Dorset Ambulance National Health Service Trust (Transfer of Trust Property) Order 1994 (S.I. 1994/896)
 B4260 Trunk Road (De-Trunking at Ross-On-Wye) Order 1994 (S.I. 1994/898)
 Medicines (Homoeopathic Medicinal Products for Human Use) Amendment Regulations 1994 (S.I. 1994/899)

901-1000

 Local Government Act 1988 (Defined Activities) (Exemption) (Broxtowe Borough Council and Harrogate Borough Council) Order 1994 (S.I. 1994/902)
 Telecommunications Industry (Rateable Values) (Amendment) Order 1994 (S.I. 1994/903)
 Nuclear Installations (Increase of Operators' Limits of Liability) Order 1994 (S.I. 1994/909)
 Education (School Teachers' Pay and Conditions) Order 1994 (S.I. 1994/910)
 Football Grounds (Rateable Values) (Scotland) Order 1994 (S.I. 1994/911)
 Mines and Quarries (Rateable Values) (Scotland) Order 1994 (S.I. 1994/912)
 Industrial and Freight Transport (Rateable Values) (Scotland) Order 1994 (S.I. 1994/913)
 Environmentally Sensitive Areas (North Kent Marshes) Designation (Amendment) Order 1994 (S.I. 1994/918)
 Environmentally Sensitive Areas (Test Valley) Designation (Amendment) Order 1994 (S.I. 1994/919)
 Environmentally Sensitive Areas (Suffolk River Valleys) Designation (Amendment) Order 1994 (S.I. 1994/920)
 Environmentally Sensitive Areas (Clun) Designation (Amendment) Order 1994 (S.I. 1994/921)
 Environmentally Sensitive Areas (North Peak) Designation (Amendment) Order 1994 (S.I. 1994/922)
 Environmentally Sensitive Areas (Breckland) Designation (Amendment) Order 1994 (S.I. 1994/923)
 Environmentally Sensitive Areas (South Wessex Downs) Designation (Amendment) Order 1994 (S.I. 1994/924)
 Environmentally Sensitive Areas (Lake District) Designation (Amendment) Order 1994 (S.I. 1994/925)
 Environmentally Sensitive Areas (South West Peak) Designation (Amendment) Order 1994 (S.I. 1994/926)
 Environmentally Sensitive Areas (Avon Valley) Designation (Amendment) Order 1994 (S.I. 1994/927)
 Environmentally Sensitive Areas (Exmoor) Designation (Amendment) Order 1994 (S.I. 1994/928)
 Environmentally Sensitive Areas (The Broads) Designation (Amendment) (No. 2) Order 1994 (S.I. 1994/929)
 Environmentally Sensitive Areas (Pennine Dales) Designation (Amendment) (No. 2) Order 1994 (S.I. 1994/930)
 Environmentally Sensitive Areas (South Downs) Designation (Amendment) (No. 2) Order 1994 (S.I. 1994/931)
 Environmentally Sensitive Areas (Somerset Levels and Moors) Designation (Amendment) (No. 2) Order 1994 (S.I. 1994/932)
 Environmentally Sensitive Areas (West Penwith) Designation (Amendment) (No. 2) Order 1994 (S.I. 1994/933)
 Leasehold Reform, Housing and Urban Development Act 1993 (Commencement No. 4) Order 1994 (S.I. 1994/935)
 Education (Grant-maintained Schools) (Finance) Regulations 1994 (S.I. 1994/938)
 Petroleum Revenue Tax (Nomination Scheme for Disposals and Appropriations) (Amendment) Regulations 1994 (S.I. 1994/939)
 Racing Pigeons (Vaccination) Order 1994 (S.I. 1994/944)
 Swansea National Health Service Trust (Transfer of Trust Property) Order 1994 (S.I. 1994/945)
 Arable Area Payments Regulations 1994 (S.I. 1994/947)
 Local Government Superannuation (Greater Manchester Buses Limited) Regulations 1994 (S.I. 1994/948)
 Foreign Companies (Execution of Documents) Regulations 1994 (S.I. 1994/950)
 Milk Marketing Board Scheme of Reorganisation (Further Extension of Period for Application) Order 1994 (S.I. 1994/951)
 Public Telecommunication System Designation (Comment Cablevision Worcester Limited) Order 1994 (S.I. 1994/952)
 Public Telecommunication System Designation (Videotron City and Westminster Limited) Order 1994 (S.I. 1994/953)
 Public Telecommunication System Designation (Telecom Securicor Cellular Radio Limited) Order 1994 (S.I. 1994/954)
 Travellers' Allowances Order 1994 (S.I. 1994/955)
 Gaming Act (Variation of Monetary Limits) Order 1994 (S.I. 1994/956)
 Gaming Act (Variation of Monetary Limits) (No.2) Order 1994 (S.I. 1994/957)
 Gaming Clubs (Hours and Charges) (Amendment) Regulations 1994 (S.I. 1994/958)
 Education (Individual Pupils' Achievements) (Information) (Wales) Regulations 1994 (S.I. 1994/959)
 Food Labelling (Scotland) Amendment Regulations 1994 (S.I. 1994/960)
 Local Government (Committees) (Devon and Cornwall) Regulations 1994 (S.I. 1994/961)
 Grants to the Redundant Churches Fund Order 1994 (S.I. 1994/962)
 Local Government Superannuation (Greater Manchester Buses North Limited) Regulations 1994 (S.I. 1994/963)
 Official Secrets (Prohibited Places) Order 1994 S.I. 1994/968)
 Combined Probation Areas (Lancashire) Order 1994 (S.I. 1994/969)
 Channel Tunnel (Application of Road Traffic Enactments) (No. 2) Order 1994 (S.I. 1994/970)
 Three Valleys, Rickmansworth and Colne Valley Water (Amendment of Local Enactments etc.) Order 1994 (S.I. 1994/977)
 Suffolk and Essex Water (Amendment of Local Enactments etc.) Order 1994 (S.I. 1994/978)
 Materials and Articles in Contact with Food (Amendment) Regulations 1994 (S.I. 1994/979)
 East Cheshire National Health Service Trust (Transfer of Trust Property) Order 1994 (S.I. 1994/986)
 North Warwickshire National Health Service Trust (Transfer of Trust Property) Order 1994 (S.I. 1994/987)
 North East Essex Mental Health National Health Service Trust (Transfer of Trust Property) Order 1994 (S.I. 1994/988)
 Two Shires Ambulance National Health Service Trust (Transfer of Trust Property) Order 1994 (S.I. 1994/989)
 East Berkshire Community Health National Health Service Trust (Transfer of Trust Property) Order 1994 (S.I. 1994/990)
 Heatherwood and Wexham Park Hospitals' National Health Service Trust(Transfer of Trust Property) Order 1994 (S.I. 1994/991)
 East Berkshire National Health Service Trust for People with Learning Disabilities (Transfer of Trust Property) Order 1994 (S.I. 1994/992)
 East Surrey Hospital and Community Healthcare National Health Service Trust(Transfer of Trust Property) Order 1994 (S.I. 1994/993)
 Southend Health Care Services National Health Service Trust (Transfer of Trust Property) Order 1994 (S.I. 1994/994)
 Southend Community Care Services National Health Service Trust (Transfer of Trust Property) Order 1994 (S.I. 1994/995)
 Advice and Assistance (Financial Conditions) (Scotland) Regulations 1994 (S.I. 1994/997)
 Civil Legal Aid (Financial Conditions) (Scotland) Regulations 1994 (S.I. 1994/998)
 Railways (Rateable Values) (Amendment) Order 1994 (S.I. 1994/999)
 Advice and Assistance (Assistance by Way of Representation) (Scotland) Amendment Regulations 1994 (S.I. 1994/1000)

1001-1100

 Criminal Legal Aid (Scotland) (Prescribed Proceedings) Regulations 1994 (S.I. 1994/1001)
 Highways (Assessment of Environmental Effects) Regulations 1994 (S.I. 1994/1002)
 Housing Benefit (General) AmendmentRegulations 1994 (S.I. 1994/1003)
 Income Support (General) Amendment Regulations 1994 (S.I. 1994/1004)
 Development Board for Rural Wales (Transfer of Housing Stock) (Amendment) Regulations 1994 (S.I. 1994/1005)
 Public Telecommunication System Designation (Insight Communications Guildford Limited) Order 1994 (S.I. 1994/1006)
 Public Telecommunication System Designation (Insight Communications Cardiff Limited) Order 1994 (S.I. 1994/1007)
 Public Telecommunication System Designation (NORWEB plc) Order 1994 (S.I. 1994/1008)
 A30 Trunk Road (Honiton to Exeter Improvement and Slip Roads) Order 1994 (S.I. 1994/1009)
 A30 Trunk Road (Honiton to Exeter Improvement)(Detrunking) Order 1994 (S.I. 1994/1010)
 M5 Motorway (Junction 29 and the A30 Trunk Road Honiton to Exeter Improvement) (Slip Roads Special Roads) Scheme 1994 (S.I. 1994/1011)
 Injuries in War (Shore Employments) Compensation (Amendment) Scheme 1994 (S.I. 1994/1012)
 Crofting Counties Agricultural Grants (Scotland) Amendment Scheme 1994 (S.I. 1994/1013)
 Crofters etc. Livestock Purchase Loans (Scotland) Revocation Scheme 1994 (S.I. 1994/1014)
 Civil Legal Aid (Scotland) (Fees) Amendment Regulations 1994 (S.I. 1994/1015)
 Legal Aid in Contempt of Court Proceedings (Scotland) Amendment Regulations 1994 (S.I. 1994/1016)
 Legal Aid (Scotland) (Children) Amendment Regulations 1994 (S.I. 1994/1017)
 Legal Aid in Contempt of Court Proceedings (Scotland) (Fees) Amendment Regulations 1994 (S.I. 1994/1018)
 Criminal Legal Aid (Scotland) (Fees) Amendment Regulations 1994 (S.I. 1994/1019)
 M1-A1 Link (Belle Isle To Bramham Crossroads Section and Connecting Roads) Scheme 1994 (S.I. 1994/1020)
 M1 Motorway (Belle Isle) Scheme 1994 (S.I. 1994/1021)
 A64 Trunk Road (Bramham Crossroads) Order 1994 (S.I. 1994/1022)
 M62/M1 Motorway (Lofthouse Interchange Diversion and Connecting Road) Scheme 1994 (S.I. 1994/1023)
 A63 Trunk Road (Selby Road Junction) Order 1994 (S.I. 1994/1024)
 A1 Trunk Road (Lengths of A1 Carriageway at Micklefield and Bramham) (Detrunking) Order 1994 (S.I. 1994/1025)
 Poultry Meat, Farmed Game Bird Meat and Rabbit Meat (Hygiene and Inspection) Regulations 1994 (S.I. 1994/1029)
 A23 Trunk Road (Coulsdon Inner Relief Road, Trunk Road and Slip Roads) Order 1994 (S.I. 1994/1037)
 A23 Trunk Road (Coulsdon Inner Relief Road) (Detrunking) Order 1994 (S.I. 1994/1038)
 British Railways Act 1990 (Arpley Chord) (Extension of Time) Order 1994 (S.I. 1994/1039)
 Education (Groups of Grant–maintained Schools) Regulations 1994 (S.I. 1994/1041)
 Gaming Clubs (Hours and Charges) (Scotland) Amendment Regulations 1994 (S.I. 1994/1042)
 Gaming Act (Variation of Monetary Limits) (Scotland) Order 1994 (S.I. 1994/1043)
 Parliamentary Elections (Returning Officers Charges) Order 1994 (S.I. 1994/1044)
 Secure Tenants (Right to Repair) (Scotland) Regulations 1994 (S.I. 1994/1046)
 Education (Special Educational Needs) Regulations 1994 (S.I. 1994/1047)
 Education (Special Educational Needs) (Information) Regulations 1994 (S.I. 1994/1048)
 Civil Legal Aid (Scotland) Amendment Regulations 1994 (S.I. 1994/1049)
 Criminal Legal Aid (Scotland) Amendment Regulations 1994 (S.I. 1994/1050)
 Ashford Hospital National Health Service Trust (Transfer of Trust Property) Order 1994 (S.I. 1994/1053)
 United Leeds Teaching Hospitals National Health Service Trust (Transfer of Trust Property) Order 1994 (S.I. 1994/1054)
 National Lottery etc. Act 1993 (Commencement No. 2 and Transitional Provisions) Order 1994 (S.I. 1994/1055)
 Waste Management Licensing Regulations 1994 (S.I. 1994/1056)
 Surface Waters (River Ecosystem) (Classification) Regulations 1994 (S.I. 1994/1057)
 Teachers Superannuation (Amendment) Regulations 1994 (S.I. 1994/1058)
 Teachers (Compensation for Redundancy and Premature Retirement) (Amendment) Regulations 1994 (S.I. 1994/1059)
 Advice and Assistance (Scotland) Amendment Regulations 1994 (S.I. 1994/1061)
 Occupational and Personal Pension Schemes (Consequential Amendments) Regulations 1994 (S.I. 1994/1062)
 Child Abduction and Custody(Parties to Conventions) (Amendment)(No. 2)Order 1994 (S.I. 1994/1063)
 Wireless Telegraphy (Guernsey) Order 1994 (S.I. 1994/1064)
 European Convention on Cinematographic Co-production Order 1994 (S.I. 1994/1065)
 Electricity (Class Exemptions from the Requirement for a Licence) (Amendment) Order 1994 (S.I. 1994/1070)
 Public Telecommunication System Designation (NYNEX CableComms Wessex) Order 1994 (S.I. 1994/1071)
 Public Telecommunication System Designation (United Artists Communications (London South) PLC) Order 1994 (S.I. 1994/1072)
 Social Security (Adjudication) Amendment Regulations 1994 (S.I. 1994/1082)
 Education (Schools Conducted by Education Associations) (Amendment) Regulations 1994 (S.I. 1994/1083)
 Education (Special Schools Conducted by Education Associations) Regulations 1994 (S.I. 1994/1084)
 Education (Schools Conducted by Education Associations) (Initial Articles of Government) (Amendment) Regulations 1994 (S.I. 1994/1085)
 Westcountry Ambulance Services National Health Service Trust (Transfer of Trust Property) Order 1994 (S.I. 1994/1086)
 London Cab Order 1994 (S.I. 1994/1087)
 A629/A650 Trunk Road (Kildwick to Crossflatts) (Detrunking) Order 1994 (S.I. 1994/1088)
 European Parliamentary Elections Act 1993 (Commencement) Order 1994 (S.I. 1994/1089)
 Registration of Restrictive Trading Agreements (EEC Documents) (Revocation) Regulations 1994 (S.I. 1994/1095)
 Environmental Protection Act 1990 (Commencement No. 15) Order 1994 (S.I. 1994/1096)

1101-1200

 Social Security (Sickness and Invalidity Benefit and Severe Disablement Allowance) Miscellaneous Amendments Regulations 1994 (S.I. 1994/1101)
 Ministry of Defence Police (Police Committee) (Amendment) Regulations 1994 (S.I. 1994/1102)
 District Probate Registries (Amendment) Order 1994 (S.I. 1994/1103)
 Merchant Shipping (Radio) (Fishing Vessels) (Amendment) Rules 1994 (S.I. 1994/1104)
 Social Security Revaluation of Earnings Factors Order 1994 (S.I. 1994/1105)
 Academic Awards and Distinctions (The Royal Scottish Academy of Music and Drama) (Scotland) Order of Council 1994 (S.I. 1994/1125)
 Land Registration (Execution of Deeds) Rules 1994 (S.I. 1994/1130)
 Integrated Administration and Control System (Amendment) Regulations 1994 (S.I. 1994/1134)
 Transfrontier Shipment of Waste Regulations 1994 (S.I. 1994/1137)
 Act of Sederunt (Rules of the Court of Session Amendment No.1) (Fees of Solicitors) 1994 (S.I. 1994/1139)
 Act of Sederunt (Rules of the Court of Session Amendment No.2) (Shorthand Writers' Fees) 1994 (S.I. 1994/1140)
 Act of Sederunt (Fees of Shorthand Writers in the Sheriff Court) 1994 (S.I. 1994/1141)
 Act of Sederunt (Fees of Solicitors in the Sheriff Court) (Amendment) 1994 (S.I. 1994/1142)
 Wildlife and Countryside Act 1981 (Variation of Schedule 4) Order 1994 (S.I. 1994/1151)
 Wildlife and Countryside (Registration and Ringing of Certain Captive Birds) (Amendment) Regulations 1994 (S.I. 1994/1152)
 Local Government Act 1988 (Defined Activities) (Exemption) (Brighton Borough Council and East Yorkshire Borough Council) Order 1994 (S.I. 1994/1167)
 National Lottery (Revocation of Licences) Procedure Regulations 1994 (S.I. 1994/1170)
 Education (School Performance Information) (Wales) Regulations 1994 (S.I. 1994/1186)
 Land Compensation (Additional Development) (Forms) (Scotland) Regulations 1994 (S.I. 1994/1187)
 Value Added Tax (Education) Order 1994 (S.I. 1994/1188)
 Gipsy Encampments (District of Wychavon) Order 1994 (S.I. 1994/1189)
 Public Telecommunication System Designation (Bradford Cable Communications Limited) Order 1994 (S.I. 1994/1190)
 Export of Goods (Control) Order 1994 (S.I. 1994/1191)
 HMSO Trading Fund (Amendment) Order 1994 (S.I. 1994/1192)
 Education (Groups of Grant-maintained Schools) (Finance) Regulations 1994 (S.I. 1994/1195)
 National Lottery (Licence Fees) Order 1994 (S.I. 1994/1200)

1201-1300

 Merchant Shipping Act 1988 (Commencement No. 4) Order 1994 (S.I. 1994/1201)
 Public Telecommunication System Designation(Sprint Holding (UK) Limited) Order 1994 (S.I. 1994/1202)
 Public Telecommunication System Designation (WORLDCOM INTERNATIONAL, INC) Order 1994 (S.I. 1994/1203)
 Public Telecommunication System Designation (Telstra (UK) Limited) Order 1994 (S.I. 1994/1204)
 Warrington Hospital National Health Service Trust (Transfer of Trust Property) Order 1994 (S.I. 1994/1205)
 Warrington Community Health Care National Health Service Trust (Transfer of Trust Property) Order 1994 (S.I. 1994/1206)
 Goods Vehicles (Operators' Licences, Qualifications and Fees) (Amendment) Regulations 1994 (S.I. 1994/1209)
 Isle of Wight (Structural Change) Order 1994 (S.I. 1994/1210)
 Halton General Hospital National Health Service Trust (Transfer of Trust Property) Order 1994 (S.I. 1994/1211)
 Income Tax (Employments) (Notional Payments) Regulations 1994 (S.I. 1994/1212)
 Cycle Racing on Highways (Tour de France 1994) Regulations 1994 (S.I. 1994/1226)
 Service Subsidy Agreements (Tendering) (Amendment) Regulations 1994 (S.I. 1994/1227)
 Probation (Amendment) Rules 1994 (S.I. 1994/1228)
 Maternity Allowance and Statutory Maternity Pay Regulations 1994 (S.I. 1994/1230)
 Education (Grant-maintained Special Schools) (Amendment) Regulations 1994 (S.I. 1994/1231)
 Education (Maintained Special Schools becoming Grant-maintained Special Schools) (Ballot Information) Regulations 1994 (S.I. 1994/1232)
 Civil Legal Aid (Scotland) (Fees) Amendment (No. 2) Regulations 1994 (S.I. 1994/1233)
 Charities (The Royal Philanthropic Society) Order 1994 (S.I. 1994/1235)
 Education (Special Educational Needs) (Amendment) Regulations 1994 (S.I. 1994/1251)
 Finance Act 1994, Section 47, (Appointed Day) (No. 2) Order 1994 (S.I. 1994/1253)
 Education (Inner London Education Authority) (Property Transfer) (Amendment) Order 1994 (S.I. 1994/1255)
 Education (Information as to Provision of Education) (England) Regulations 1994 (S.I. 1994/1256)
 Finance Act 1994, section 45, (Appointed Day) Order 1994 (S.I. 1994/1257)
 Weights and Measures (Packaged Goods) (Amendment) Regulations 1994 (S.I. 1994/1258)
 Measuring Equipment (Capacity Measures) (Amendment) Regulations 1994 (S.I. 1994/1259)
 National Health Service (District Health Authorities) (No. 2) Order 1994 (S.I. 1994/1260)
 National Health Service (Determination of Districts) (No. 2) Order 1994 (S.I. 1994/1261)
 Regional and District Health Authorities (Membership and Procedure) Amendment Regulations 1994 (S.I. 1994/1262)
 Collective Enfranchisement and Tenants' Audit (Qualified Surveyors) Regulations 1994 (S.I. 1994/1263)
 Motor Vehicles (Type Approval and Approval Marks) (Fees) Regulations 1994 (S.I. 1994/1265)
 Building Standards (Scotland) Amendment Regulations 1994 (S.I. 1994/1266)
 Surrey Ambulance National Health Service Trust (Change of Name) Order 1994 (S.I. 1994/1268)
 Salford Hospitals National Health Service Trust (Change of Name) Order 1994 (S.I. 1994/1269)
 Education (National Curriculum) (Exceptions in Welsh at Key Stage 4) Regulations 1994 (S.I. 1994/1270)
 Environmental Protection (Prescribed Processes and Substances Etc.) (Amendment) Regulations 1994 (S.I. 1994/1271)
 County Court (Amendment No. 2) Rules 1994 (S.I. 1994/1288)
 County Court (Forms) (Amendment) Rules 1994 (S.I. 1994/1289)
 Habitat (Water Fringe) Regulations 1994 (S.I. 1994/1291)
 Habitat (Former Set-Aside Land) Regulations 1994 (S.I. 1994/1292)
 Habitat (Salt-Marsh) Regulations 1994 (S.I. 1994/1293)
 Two Shires Ambulance National Health Service Trust (Transfer of Trust Property) (No. 2) Order 1994 (S.I. 1994/1294)
 West Berkshire Priority Care Service National Health Service Trust (Transfer of Trust Property) Order 1994 (S.I. 1994/1295)
 Royal Cornwall Hospitals National Health Service Trust (Transfer of Trust Property) Order 1994 (S.I. 1994/1296)
 Royal Berkshire and Battle Hospitals National Health Service Trust (Transfer of Trust Property) Order 1994 (S.I. 1994/1297)
 Royal Berkshire Ambulance National Health Service Trust (Transfer of Trust Property) Order 1994 (S.I. 1994/1298)
 Grimsby Health National Health Service Trust (Transfer of Trust Property) Order 1994 (S.I. 1994/1299)
 East Hertfordshire National Health Service Trust (Transfer of Trust Property) Order 1994 (S.I. 1994/1300)

1301-1400

 Countess of Chester Hospital National Health Service Trust (Transfer of Trust Property) Order 1994 (S.I. 1994/1301)
 Farm and Conservation Grant (Variation) Scheme 1994 (S.I. 1994/1302)
 Education (Lay Members of Appeal Committees) Regulations 1994 (S.I. 1994/1303)
 Religious Education (Meetings of Local Conferences and Councils) Regulations 1994 (S.I. 1994/1304)
 Taxes (Interest Rate) (Amendment) Regulations 1994 (S.I. 1994/1307)
 Police (Amendment) Regulations 1994 (S.I. 1994/1308)
 Airedale National Health Service Trust (Transfer of Trust Property) Order 1994 (S.I. 1994/1309)
 Avon Ambulance Service National Health Service Trust (Transfer of Trust Property) Order 1994 (S.I. 1994/1310)
 Barnet Community Healthcare National Health Service Trust (Transfer of Trust Property) Order 1994 (S.I. 1994/1311)
 Chase Farm Hospitals National Health Service Trust (Transfer of Trust Property) Order 1994 (S.I. 1994/1312)
 Chorley and South Ribble National Health Service Trust (Transfer of Trust Property) Order 1994 (S.I. 1994/1313)
 Community Health Services, Southern Derbyshire National Health Service Trust (Transfer of Trust Property) Order 1994 (S.I. 1994/1314)
 Cornwall Healthcare National Health Service Trust (Transfer of Trust Property) Order 1994 (S.I. 1994/1315)
 East Sussex Health Authority (Transfer of Trust Property) Order 1994 (S.I. 1994/1316)
 Derby City General Hospital National Health Service Trust (Transfer of Trust Property) Order 1994 (S.I. 1994/1317)
 Durham County Ambulance Service National Health Service Trust (Transfer of Trust Property) Order 1994 (S.I. 1994/1318)
 Exeter and North Devon Health Authority (Transfer of Trust Property) Order 1994 (S.I. 1994/1319)
 Fosse Health, Leicestershire Community National Health Service Trust (Transfer of Trust Property) Order 1994 (S.I. 1994/1320)
 Education (Distribution by Schools of Information about Further Education Institutions) (Wales) Regulations 1994 (S.I. 1994/1321)
 Child Abduction and Custody (Parties to Conventions) (Amendment) (No. 3) Order 1994 (S.I. 1994/1322)
 Haiti (United Nations Sanctions) Order 1994 (S.I. 1994/1323)
 Haiti (United Nations Sanctions) (Dependent Territories) Order 1994 (S.I. 1994/1324)
 Haiti (United Nations Sanctions) (Channel Islands) Order 1994 (S.I. 1994/1325)
 Haiti (United Nations Sanctions) (Isle of Man) Order 1994 (S.I. 1994/1326)
 European Communities (Designation) (No. 2) Order 1994 (S.I. 1994/1327)
 South Yorkshire Light Rail Transit (Penalty Fares) (Activating) Order 1994 (S.I. 1994/1328)
 Environmental Protection (Prescribed Processes and Substances Etc.) (Amendment) (No. 2) Regulations 1994 (S.I. 1994/1329)
 A50 Trunk Road (Blythe Bridge to Queensway and Connecting Roads) (No 2) Order 1994 (S.I. 1994/1330)
 Lydney and Parkend Light Railway (Extension and Amendment) Order 1994 (S.I. 1994/1331)
 Wiltshire Ambulance Service National Health Service Trust (Transfer of Trust Property) Order 1994 (S.I. 1994/1332)
 Hereford and Worcester Ambulance Service National Health Service Trust (Transfer of Trust Property) Order 1994 (S.I. 1994/1333)
 Scunthorpe Community Health Care National Health Service Trust (Transfer of Trust Property) Order 1994 (S.I. 1994/1334)
 Scunthorpe and Goole Hospitals National Health Service Trust (Transfer of Trust Property) Order 1994 (S.I. 1994/1335)
 Southern Derbyshire Mental Health National Health Service Trust (Transfer of Trust Property) Order 1994 (S.I. 1994/1336)
 Thameslink Healthcare Services National Health Service Trust (Transfer of Trust Property) Order 1994 (S.I. 1994/1337)
 South Warwickshire Health Care National Health Service Trust (Transfer of Trust Property) Order 1994 (S.I. 1994/1338)
 West London Healthcare National Health Service Trust (Transfer of Trust Property) Order 1994 (S.I. 1994/1339)
 West Middlesex University Hospital National Health Service Trust (Transfer of Trust Property) Order 1994 (S.I. 1994/1340)
 Worcester Royal Infirmary National Health Service Trust (Transfer of Trust Property) Order 1994 (S.I. 1994/1341)
 National Lottery etc. Act 1993 (Amendment of Section 23) Order 1994 (S.I. 1994/1342)
 Bedfordshire and Hertfordshire Ambulance and Paramedic Service National Health Service Trust (Transfer of Trust Property) Order 1994 (S.I. 1994/1343)
 Road Vehicles (Registration and Licensing) (Amendment) Regulations 1994 (S.I. 1994/1364)
 Trade Union Reform and Employment Rights Act 1993 (Commencement No. 3 and Transitional Provisions) Order 1994 (S.I. 1994/1365)
 Social Security Maternity Benefits and Statutory Sick Pay (Amendment) Regulations 1994 (S.I. 1994/1367)
 Road Traffic (Special Parking Areas) (London Boroughs of Bromley, Hammersmith and Fulham and Lewisham) (Amendment No. 2) Order 1994 (S.I. 1994/1376)
 Road Traffic (Special Parking Areas) (London Borough of Richmond upon Thames) (Amendment) Order 1994 (S.I. 1994/1377)
 Road Traffic (Special Parking Areas) (London Boroughs of Camden, Hackney and Hounslow) (Amendment) Order 1994 (S.I. 1994/1378)
 European Parliamentary Elections (Returning Officers' Charges) Order 1994 (S.I. 1994/1379)
 Commissioners for Oaths (Prescribed Bodies) Regulations 1994 (S.I. 1994/1380)
 Ancient Monuments (Class Consents) Order 1994 (S.I. 1994/1381)
 Hovercraft (Fees) Regulations 1994 (S.I. 1994/1382)
 Merchant Shipping (Ro-Ro Passenger Ship Survivability) (No. 2) Regulations 1994 (S.I. 1994/1383)
 Household Appliances (Noise Emission) (Amendment) Regulations 1994 (S.I. 1994/1386)
 Cornwall Healthcare National Health Service Trust (Transfer of Trust Property) Order (No. 2) 1994 (S.I. 1994/1388)
 Local Authorities (Goods and Services) (Public Bodies) (No. 2) Order 1994 (S.I. 1994/1389)
 Channel Tunnel (Amendment of the Fisheries Act 1981) Order 1994 (S.I. 1994/1390)

1401-1500
 A570 Trunk Road (Southport Road, Ormskirk) (40 Miles Per Hour Speed Limit) Order 1994 (S.I. 1994/1401)
 Medicines (Child Safety) Amendment Regulations 1994 (S.I. 1994/1402)
 Marketing Development Scheme 1994 (S.I. 1994/1403)
 Marketing Development Scheme (Specification of Activities) Order 1994 (S.I. 1994/1404)
 Channel Tunnel (Miscellaneous Provisions) Order 1994 (S.I. 1994/1405)
 National Health Service Trusts (Membership and Procedure) (Scotland) Amendment Regulations 1994 (S.I. 1994/1408)
 Guarantee Payments (Exemption) (No. 29) Order 1994 (S.I. 1994/1409)
 Free Zone (Southampton) Designation (Variation) Order 1994 (S.I. 1994/1410)
 Reconstitution of the Langport District Drainage Board Order 1994 (S.I. 1994/1411)
 European Parliamentary Elections (Returning Officer's Charges) (Northern Ireland) Order 1994 (S.I. 1994/1412)
 Parliamentary Elections (Returning Officer's Charges) (Northern Ireland) Order 1994 (S.I. 1994/1413)
 Education (Special Educational Needs Code of Practice) (Appointed Day) Order 1994 (S.I. 1994/1414)
 Double Taxation Relief (Taxes on Income) (United States of America Dividends) (Amendment) Regulations 1994 (S.I. 1994/1418)
 Council Tax Limitation (Sheffield City Council) (Maximum Amount) Order 1994 (S.I. 1994/1419)
 Education (School Performance Information) (England) Regulations 1994 (S.I. 1994/1420)
 Education (School Information) (England) Regulations 1994 (S.I. 1994/1421)
 Coal Industry (Restructuring Grants) Order 1994 (S.I. 1994/1422)
 Oil and Fibre Plant Seeds (Amendment) Regulations 1994 (S.I. 1994/1423)
 Home-Grown Cereals Authority (Rate of Levy) Order 1994 (S.I. 1994/1424)
 Non-Domestic Rating Contributions (England) (Amendment No. 2) Regulations 1994 (S.I. 1994/1431)
 Railway Pensions (Protection and Designation of Schemes) Order 1994 (S.I. 1994/1432)
 Railways Pension Scheme Order 1994 (S.I. 1994/1433)
 Cleveland Tertiary College (Incorporation) Order 1994 (S.I. 1994/1434)
 Cleveland Tertiary College (Government) Regulations 1994 (S.I. 1994/1435)
 Bail (Amendment) Act 1993 (Commencement) Order 1994 (S.I. 1994/1437)
 Bail (Amendment) Act 1993 (Prescription of Prosecuting Authorities) Order 1994 (S.I. 1994/1438)
 Local Government (Direct Labour Organisations) (Competition) (Amendment) (England) Regulations 1994 (S.I. 1994/1439)
 Wells Harbour Revision Order 1994 (S.I. 1994/1440)
 Plant Health Fees (Scotland) Order 1994 (S.I. 1994/1441)
 Town and Country Planning (General Permitted Development) (Scotland) Amendment Order 1994 (S.I. 1994/1442)
 Act of Sederunt (Rules of the Court of Session 1994) 1994 (S.I. 1994/1443)
 Rules of the Air (Third Amendment) Regulations 1994 (S.I. 1994/1444)
 Local Government Act 1992 (Commencement No. 4) Order 1994 (S.I. 1994/1445)
 Milk and Dairies and Milk (Special Designation) (Charges) (Amendment) Regulations 1994 (S.I. 1994/1446)
 Diseases of Fish (Control) Regulations 1994 (S.I. 1994/1447)
 Fish Health (Amendment) Regulations 1994 (S.I. 1994/1448)
 Education (Further Education Corporations) Order 1994 (S.I. 1994/1449)
 Coleg Menai (Government) Regulations 1994 (S.I. 1994/1450)
 Civil Aviation (Route Charges for Navigation Services) (Third Amendment) Regulations 1994 (S.I. 1994/1468)
 Legal Aid in Criminal and Care Proceedings (Costs) (Amendment) Regulations 1994 (S.I. 1994/1477)
 Education (Gwynedd Technical College and Coleg Pencraig) (Dissolution) Order 1994 (S.I. 1994/1478)
 Income Tax (Definition of Unit Trust Scheme) (Amendment) Regulations 1994 (S.I. 1994/1479)
 Crown Court (Amendment) Rules 1994 (S.I. 1994/1480)
 Magistrates' Courts (Bail) (Amendment) Rules 1994 (S.I. 1994/1481)
 Road Traffic Act 1991 (Commencement No. 11 and Transitional Provisions) Order 1994 (S.I. 1994/1482)
 Road Traffic Act 1991 (Commencement No. 12 and Transitional Provisions) Order 1994 (S.I. 1994/1484)
 Flavourings in Food (Amendment) Regulations 1994 (S.I. 1994/1486)
 Road Traffic (Special Parking Area) (London Borough of Bexley) Order 1994 (S.I. 1994/1487)
 Road Traffic (Special Parking Area) (London Borough of Barking and Dagenham) Order 1994 (S.I. 1994/1488)
 Road Traffic (Special Parking Area) (London Borough of Ealing) Order 1994 (S.I. 1994/1489)
 Road Traffic (Special Parking Area) (London Borough of Croydon) Order 1994 (S.I. 1994/1490)
 Road Traffic (Special Parking Area) (City of London) Order 1994 (S.I. 1994/1491)
 Road Traffic (Special Parking Area) (London Borough of Haringey) Order 1994 (S.I. 1994/1492)
 Road Traffic (Special Parking Area) (London Borough of Harrow) Order 1994 (S.I. 1994/1493)
 Road Traffic (Special Parking Area) (London Borough of Havering) Order 1994 (S.I. 1994/1494)
 Road Traffic (Special Parking Area) (London Borough of Greenwich) Order 1994 (S.I. 1994/1495)
 Road Traffic (Special Parking Area) (London Borough of Enfield) Order 1994 (S.I. 1994/1496)
 Road Traffic (Special Parking Area) (Royal Borough of Kingston upon Thames) Order 1994 (S.I. 1994/1497)
 Road Traffic (Special Parking Area) (Royal Borough of Kensington and Chelsea) Order 1994 (S.I. 1994/1498)
 Road Traffic (Special Parking Area) (London Borough of Islington) Order 1994 (S.I. 1994/1499)
 Road Traffic (Special Parking Area) (London Borough of Hillingdon) Order 1994 (S.I. 1994/1500)

1501-1600

 Road Traffic (Special Parking Area) (London Borough of Waltham Forest) Order 1994 (S.I. 1994/1501)
 Road Traffic (Special Parking Area) (London Borough of Brent) Order 1994 (S.I. 1994/1502)
 Removal and Disposal of Vehicles (Amendment) Regulations 1994 (S.I. 1994/1503)
 Road Traffic (Special Parking Area) (City of Westminster) Order 1994 (S.I. 1994/1504)
 Road Traffic (Special Parking Areas) (London Borough of Barnet) Order 1994 (S.I. 1994/1505)
 Road Traffic (Special Parking Area) (London Borough of Newham) Order 1994 (S.I. 1994/1506)
 Road Traffic (Special Parking Area) (London Borough of Sutton) Order 1994 (S.I. 1994/1507)
 Road Traffic (Special Parking Areas) (London Borough of Lambeth) Order 1994 (S.I. 1994/1508)
 Road Traffic (Special Parking Area) (London Borough of Redbridge) Order 1994 (S.I. 1994/1509)
 Road Traffic (Special Parking Area) (London Borough of Merton) Order 1994 (S.I. 1994/1510)
 Children's Homes Amendment Regulations 1994 (S.I. 1994/1511)
 Insurance Companies (Accounts and Statements) (Amendment) Regulations 1994 (S.I. 1994/1515)
 Insurance Companies Regulations 1994 (S.I. 1994/1516)
 Financial Services Act 1986 (Miscellaneous Exemptions) Order 1994 (S.I. 1994/1517)
 Private Medical Insurance (Disentitlement to Tax Relief and Approved Benefits) Regulations 1994 (S.I. 1994/1518)
 Traffic Signs Regulations and General Directions 1994 (S.I. 1994/1519)
 Education (National Curriculum) (Attainment Targets and Programmes of Study in Science) (Amendment) Order 1994 (S.I. 1994/1520)
 Private Medical Insurance (Tax Relief) (Amendment) Regulations 1994 (S.I. 1994/1527)
 Suckler Cow Premium (Amendment) Regulations 1994 (S.I. 1994/1528)
 Cosmetic Products (Safety) (Amendment) Regulations 1994 (S.I. 1994/1529)
 Medicines (Medicated Animal Feeding Stuffs) (Amendment) Regulations 1994 (S.I. 1994/1531)
 Railtrack (Marsh Lane, Leeds, Footbridge) Order 1994 (S.I. 1994/1532)
 Reservoirs (Panels of Civil Engineers) (Application Fees) (Amendment) Regulations 1994 (S.I. 1994/1533)
 West Lindsey National Health Service Trust (Establishment) Amendment Order 1994 (S.I. 1994/1534)
 National Health Service (Charges to Overseas Visitors) (Amendment) Regulations 1994 (S.I. 1994/1535)
 Civil Courts (Amendment No. 2) Order 1994 (S.I. 1994/1536)
 Combined Probation Areas (Gloucestershire) S.I. 1994/1542)
 Combined Probation Areas (Oxfordshire) S.I. 1994/1543)
 Social Security (Contributions) Amendment (No. 2) Regulations 1994 (S.I. 1994/1553)
 Medicines (Fees Relating to Medicinal Products for Animal Use) Regulations 1994 (S.I. 1994/1554)
 Ashford Hospitals National Health Service Trust (Establishment) Amendment Order 1994 (S.I. 1994/1555)
 Strathclyde Regional Council (Kilduskland) Water Order 1994 (S.I. 1994/1556)
 Anti-Competitive Practices (Exclusions) (Amendment) Order 1994 (S.I. 1994/1557)
 Education Act 1993 (Commencement No. 4) Order 1994 (S.I. 1994/1558)
 Blackburn, Hyndburn and Ribble Valley Health Care National Health Service Trust (Transfer of Trust Property) Order 1994 (S.I. 1994/1559)
 CommuniCare National Health Service Trust (Transfer of Trust Property) Order 1994 (S.I. 1994/1560)
 Harrow and Hillingdon Healthcare National Health Service Trust (Transfer of Trust Property) Order 1994 (S.I. 1994/1561)
 Leeds Community and Mental Health Services Teaching National Health Service Trust (Transfer of Trust Property) Order 1994 (S.I. 1994/1562)
 Maidstone Priority Care National Health Service Trust (Transfer of Trust Property) Order 1994 (S.I. 1994/1563)
 Peterborough Hospitals National Health Service Trust (Transfer of Trust Property) Order 1994 (S.I. 1994/1564)
 A23 Trunk Road (Purley Way, Croydon) (Box Junction) Order 1994 (S.I. 1994/1566)
 Taxes (Interest Rate) (Amendment No. 2) Regulations 1994 (S.I. 1994/1567)
 Fishing Vessels (Decommissioning) Scheme 1994 (S.I. 1994/1568)
 Northern Ireland (Emergency and Prevention of Terrorism Provisions)(Continuance) Order 1994 (S.I. 1994/1569)
 Motor Vehicles (EC Type Approval) (Amendment) (No.2) Regulations 1994 (S.I. 1994/1570)
 Gloucestershire Ambulance Service National Health Service Trust (Transfer of Trust Property) Order 1994 (S.I. 1994/1571)
 Bromley Hospitals National Health Service Trust (Transfer of Trust Property) Order 1994 (S.I. 1994/1572)
 Mid Kent Healthcare National Health Service Trust (Transfer of Trust Property) Order 1994 (S.I. 1994/1573)
 Shropshire's Mental Health National Health Service Trust (Transfer of Trust Property) Order 1994 (S.I. 1994/1574)
 Wellhouse National Health Service Trust (Transfer of Trust Property) Order 1994 (S.I. 1994/1575)
 North West Anglia Health Care National Health Service Trust (Transfer of Trust Property) Order 1994 (S.I. 1994/1576)

1601-1700

 Civil Aviation (Canadian Navigation Services) (Fifth Amendment) Regulations 1994 (S.I. 1994/1601)
 Education (Mandatory Awards) (Amendment) Regulations 1994 (S.I. 1994/1606)
 Central Scotland Healthcare National Health Service Trust (Establishment) Order 1994 (S.I. 1994/1607)
 Income-related Benefits Schemes (Miscellaneous Amendments) (No.2) Regulations 1994 (S.I. 1994/1608)
 Patents County Court (Designation and Jurisdiction) Order 1994 (S.I. 1994/1609)
 Feedingstuffs (Sampling and Analysis) (Amendment) Regulations 1994 (S.I. 1994/1610)
 Road Traffic (Special Parking Area) (London Borough of Tower Hamlets) Order 1994 (S.I. 1994/1613)
 London—Fishguard Trunk Road (A40) (Whitland By–Pass) Order 1994 (S.I. 1994/1614)
 Industrial Tribunals Extension of Jurisdiction (England and Wales) Order 1994 (S.I. 1994/1623)
 Industrial Tribunals Extension of Jurisdiction (Scotland) Order 1994 (S.I. 1994/1624)
 Export of Goods (Control) Order 1994 (Amendment) Order 1994 (S.I. 1994/1632)
 Education (Chief Inspector of Schools in England) Order 1994 (S.I. 1994/1633)
 British Nationality (South Africa) Order 1994 (S.I. 1994/1634)
 Criminal Justice (International Co-operation) (Anguilla) Order 1994 (S.I. 1994/1635)
 South Africa (United Nations Arms Embargo) (Prohibited Transactions) Revocations Order 1994 (S.I. 1994/1636)
 United Nations Arms Embargoes (Amendment) (Rwanda) Order 1994 (S.I. 1994/1637)
 Virgin Islands (Constitution) (Amendment) Order 1994 (S.I. 1994/1638)
 Criminal Justice Act 1988 (Designated Countries and Territories) (Amendment) Order 1994 (S.I. 1994/1639)
 Criminal Justice (International Co-operation) Act 1990 (Enforcement of Overseas Forfeiture Orders) (Amendment) Order 1994 (S.I. 1994/1640)
 Drug Trafficking Offences Act 1986 (Designated Countries and Territories) (Amendment) Order 1994 (S.I. 1994/1641)
 International Headquarters and Defence Organisations (Designation and Privileges) (Amendment) Order 1994 (S.I. 1994/1642)
 Visiting Forces and International Headquarters (Application of Law) (Amendment) Order 1994 (S.I. 1994/1643)
 Confiscation of the Proceeds of Drug Trafficking (Designated Countries and Territories) (Scotland) Amendment Order 1994 (S.I. 1994/1644)
 Criminal Justice (International Co-operation) Act 1990 (Enforcement of Overseas Forfeiture Orders) (Scotland) Amendment Order 1994 (S.I. 1994/1645)
 Social Security (Cyprus) Order 1994 (S.I. 1994/1646)
 Lancaster Port Commission Harbour Revision Order 1994 (S.I. 1994/1647)
 Railways Act 1993 (Commencement No. 5 and Transitional Provisions) Order 1994 (S.I. 1994/1648)
 Railways Act 1993 (Consequential Modifications) (No. 2) Order 1994 (S.I. 1994/1649)
 Bournemouth and West Hampshire Water (Amendment of Local Enactments etc.) Order 1994 (S.I. 1994/1650)
 Social Security Act 1989 (Commencement No. 5) Order 1994 (S.I. 1994/1661)
 European Parliamentary (United Kingdom Representatives) Pensions (Consolidation and Amendment) Order 1994 (S.I. 1994/1662)
 European Parliament (Pay and Pensions) Act 1979 (Section 3 (Amendment) Order 1994 (S.I. 1994/1663)
 Football Spectators (Seating) Order 1994 (S.I. 1994/1666)
 Channel Tunnel (Application of Road Traffic Enactments) (No. 2) Order 1994 (S.I. 1994/1667)
 Local Government Act 1988 (Competition) (Defined Activities) (Housing Management) Order 1994 (S.I. 1994/1671)
 Education (School Teachers' Pay and Conditions) (No. 2) Order 1994 (S.I. 1994/1673)
 Mental Health (Class of Nurse) (Scotland) Order 1994 (S.I. 1994/1675)
 Sea Fishing (Enforcement of Community Quota Measures) Order 1994 (S.I. 1994/1679)
 Sea Fishing (Enforcement of Community Conservation Measures) (Amendment) (No. 6) Order 1994 (S.I. 1994/1680)
 Third Country Fishing (Enforcement) Order 1994 (S.I. 1994/1681)
 Cheshire County Council (Trent and Mersey Canal Bridge, Wheelock) Scheme 1993 Confirmation Instrument 1994 (S.I. 1994/1682)
 Electricity (Class Exemptions from the Requirement for a Licence) (Amendment) (No. 2) Order 1994 (S.I. 1994/1683)
 Essex County Council (Haven Road Bridge) Scheme 1993 Confirmation Instrument 1994 (S.I. 1994/1688)
 Finance Act 1994, section 7, (Appointed Day) Order 1994 (S.I. 1994/1690)
 North Killingholme Haven Harbour Empowerment Order 1994 (S.I. 1994/1693)
 Youth Courts (London) Order 1994 (S.I. 1994/1695)
 Insurance Companies (Third Insurance Directives) Regulations 1994 (S.I. 1994/1696)
 Education (Amount to Follow Permanently Excluded Pupil) Regulations 1994 (S.I. 1994/1697)
 Insurance Premium Tax (Taxable Insurance Contracts) Order 1994 (S.I. 1994/1698)

1701-1800

 Organic Aid (Scotland) Regulations 1994 (S.I. 1994/1701)
 Teaching Council (Scotland) Election Amendment Scheme 1994 Approval Order 1994 (S.I. 1994/1702)
 Organic Farming (Aid) Regulations 1994 (S.I. 1994/1712)
 Duncan of Jordanstone College of Art (Closure) (Scotland) Order 1994 (S.I. 1994/1715)
 Rabies (Importation of Dogs, Cats and Other Mammals) (Amendment) Order 1994 (S.I. 1994/1716)
 A570 St. Helens-Ormskirk-Southport Trunk Road (Moor Street and St. Helens Road, Ormskirk) (Detrunking) Order 1994 (S.I. 1994/1719)
 Organic Farming (Aid) Regulations 1994 (S.I. 1994/1721)
 Nitrate Sensitive Areas Regulations 1994 (S.I. 1994/1729)
 Metropolitan Police Force (Compensation for Loss of Office) Regulations 1994 (S.I. 1994/1730)
 Access for Community Air Carriers to Intra-Community Air Routes (Second Amendment and other Provisions) Regulations 1994 (S.I. 1994/1731)
 Licensing of Air Carriers (Third Amendment and other Provisions) Regulations 1994 (S.I. 1994/1732)
 Civil Aviation (Personnel Licences) Order 1992 (Amendment) Regulations 1994 (S.I. 1994/1733)
 Aeroplane Noise (Limitation on Operation of Aeroplanes) (Amendment) Regulations 1994 (S.I. 1994/1734)
 Air Fares (Third Amendment) Regulations 1994 (S.I. 1994/1735)
 Airports Slot Allocation (Second Amendment) Regulations 1994 (S.I. 1994/1736)
 Aircraft Operators (Accounts and Records) Regulations 1994 (S.I. 1994/1737)
 Air Passenger Duty Regulations 1994 (S.I. 1994/1738)
 Customs Duties (ECSC) (Quota and other Reliefs) (No. 2) Order 1994 (S.I. 1994/1739)
 Portsmouth College of Art, Design and Further Education (Dissolution) Order 1994 (S.I. 1994/1741)
 Non–Domestic Rating Contributions (Wales) (Amendment) (No. 2) Regulations 1994 (S.I. 1994/1742)
 Education (National Curriculum) (Attainment Targets and Programmes of Study in History) (Wales) (Amendment) Order 1994 (S.I. 1994/1743)
 Education (National Curriculum) (Attainment Targets and Programmes of Study in Geography) (Wales) (Amendment) Order 1994 (S.I. 1994/1744)
 Council Tax (Alteration of Lists and Appeals) (Amendment) Regulations 1994 (S.I. 1994/1746)
 Council Tax (Situation and Valuation of Dwellings) (Amendment) Regulations 1994 (S.I. 1994/1747)
 Race Relations (Interest on Awards) Regulations 1994 (S.I. 1994/1748)
 Protected Rights (Transfer Payment) Amendment Regulations 1994 (S.I. 1994/1751)
 River Humber (Upper Burcom Cooling Works) Order 1994 (S.I. 1994/1753)
 Epsom School of Art and Design (Dissolution) Order 1994 (S.I. 1994/1754)
 Cleveland College of Further Education and Sir William Turners Sixth Form College, Redcar (Dissolution) Order 1994 (S.I. 1994/1755)
 Criminal Justice (International Co-operation) Act 1990 (Crown Servants) Regulations 1994 (S.I. 1994/1756)
 Drug Trafficking Offences Act 1986 (Crown Servants and Regulators etc.) Regulations 1994 (S.I. 1994/1757)
 Prevention of Terrorism (Temporary Provisions) Act 1989 (Crown Servants and Regulators etc.) Regulations 1994 (S.I. 1994/1758)
 Criminal Justice Act 1988(Crown Servants) Regulations 1994 (S.I. 1994/1759)
 Northern Ireland (Emergency Provisions) Act 1991 (Crown Servants and Regulators etc.) Regulations 1994 (S.I. 1994/1760)
 Wirral Tramway Light Railway Order 1994 (S.I. 1994/1761)
 Housing (Right to Buy) (Priority of Charges) Order 1994 (S.I. 1994/1762)
 Mortgage Indemnities (Recognised Bodies) Order 1994 (S.I. 1994/1763)
 Plugs and Sockets etc. (Safety) Regulations 1994 (S.I. 1994/1768)
 Act of Adjournal (Consolidation Amendment) (Miscellaneous) 1994 (S.I. 1994/1769)
 National Health Service (Charges to Overseas Visitors) (Scotland) Amendment Regulations 1994 (S.I. 1994/1770)
 Ecclesiastical Exemption (Listed Buildings and Conservation Areas) Order 1994 (S.I. 1994/1771)
 Northern Ireland Act 1974 (Interim Period Extension) Order 1994 (S.I. 1994/1772)
 Finance Act 1994 (Appointed Day) Order 1994 (S.I. 1994/1773)
 Insurance Premium Tax Regulations 1994 (S.I. 1994/1774)
 Human Fertilisation and Embryology Act 1990 (Commencement No. 5) Order 1994 (S.I. 1994/1776)
 Severn Bridge (Amendment) Regulations 1994 (S.I. 1994/1777)
 Lerwick Harbour Revision Order 1994 (S.I. 1994/1778)
 Social Security (Attendance Allowance and Disability Living Allowance) (Amendment) Regulations 1994 (S.I. 1994/1779)
 A20 Trunk Road (Sidcup Road, Greenwich) (Prohibition of Use of Gaps in Central Reservation) Order 1994 (S.I. 1994/1780)

1801-1900

 Chinnor and Princes Risborough Railway Order 1994 (S.I. 1994/1803)
 Notification of Existing Substances (Enforcement) Regulations 1994 (S.I. 1994/1806)
 Income-related Benefits Schemes (Miscellaneous Amendments) (No. 3) Regulations 1994 (S.I. 1994/1807)
 Criminal Justice (Scotland) Act 1987 (Crown Servants and Regulators Etc.) Regulations 1994 (S.I. 1994/1808)
 Non-Domestic Rating (Alteration of Lists and Appeals) (Amendment) Regulations 1994 (S.I. 1994/1809)
 Special Commissioners (Jurisdiction and Procedure) Regulations 1994 (S.I. 1994/1811)
 General Commissioners (Jurisdiction and Procedure) Regulations 1994 (S.I. 1994/1812)
 General and Special Commissioners (Amendment of Enactments) Regulations 1994 (S.I. 1994/1813)
 Education (National Curriculum) (Foundation Subjects at Key Stage 4) Order 1994 (S.I. 1994/1814)
 Education (National Curriculum) (Attainment Targets and Programmes of Study in Modern Foreign Languages and Technology at Key Stage 4) (Amendment) Order 1994 (S.I. 1994/1815)
 Education (National Curriculum) (Attainment Targets and Programmes of Study in History) (England) (Amendment) Order 1994 (S.I. 1994/1816)
 Education (National Curriculum) (Attainment Targets and Programmes of Study in Geography) (England) (Amendment) Order 1994 (S.I. 1994/1817)
 Education (National Curriculum) (Modern Foreign Languages) (Amendment) Order 1994 (S.I. 1994/1818)
 Insurance Premium Tax (Prescribed Rates of Interest) Order 1994 (S.I. 1994/1819)
 Air Passenger Duty (Prescribed Rates of Interest) Order 1994 (S.I. 1994/1820)
 Air Passenger Duty (Connected Flights) Order 1994 (S.I. 1994/1821)
 Civil Legal Aid (General) (Amendment) (No. 2) Regulations 1994 (S.I. 1994/1822)
 Legal Advice and Assistance (Amendment) (No. 2) Regulations 1994 (S.I. 1994/1823)
 Legal Advice and Assistance at Police Stations (Remuneration) (Amendment) Regulations 1994 (S.I. 1994/1824)
 Legal Aid in Criminal and Care Proceedings (Costs) (Amendment) (No. 2) Regulations 1994 (S.I. 1994/1825)
 St. Mary's Music School (Aided Places) Amendment Regulations 1994 (S.I. 1994/1826)
 Education (Assisted Places) (Scotland) Amendment Regulations 1994 (S.I. 1994/1827)
 Inshore Fishing (Prohibition of Fishing for Cockles) (Scotland) Order 1994 (S.I. 1994/1828)
 Lincolnshire College of Art and Design and Lincolnshire College of Agriculture and Horticulture (Dissolution) Order 1994 (S.I. 1994/1830)
 Authorities for London Post-Graduate Teaching Hospitals (Abolition) Order 1994 (S.I. 1994/1831)
 Social Security Benefit (Persons Abroad) Amendment (No. 2) Regulations 1994 (S.I. 1994/1832)
 Offshore Installations (Safety Zones) (No. 2) Order 1994 (S.I. 1994/1836)
 Social Security (Credits) Amendment Regulations 1994 (S.I. 1994/1837)
 Passenger and Goods Vehicles (Recording Equipment) Regulations 1994 (S.I. 1994/1838)
 Sunday Trading Act 1994 Appointed Day Order 1994 (S.I. 1994/1841)
 Protection of Wrecks (Designation No. 1) Order 1994 (S.I. 1994/1842)
 Building Regulations (Amendment) Regulations 1994 (S.I. 1994/1850)
 Weights and Measures (Metrication Amendments) Regulations 1994 (S.I. 1994/1851)
 Weights and Measures (Packaged Goods and Quantity Marking and Abbreviations of Units) (Amendment) Regulations 1994 (S.I. 1994/1852)
 Price Marking (Amendment) Order 1994 (S.I. 1994/1853)
 Seed Potatoes (Fees) (Scotland) Order 1994 (S.I. 1994/1859)
 Education (Annual Consideration of Ballot on Grant-Maintained Status) (Wales) Order 1994 (S.I. 1994/1861)
 Motor Vehicles (Driving Licences) (Amendment)(No. 2) Regulations 1994 (S.I. 1994/1862)
 Statutory Maternity Pay (Compensation of Employers) and Miscellaneous Amendment Regulations 1994 (S.I. 1994/1882)
 Weights and Measures (Intoxicating Liquor) (Amendment) Order 1994 (S.I. 1994/1883)
 Weights and Measures (Cosmetic Products) Order 1994 (S.I. 1994/1884)
 Local Authorities (Charges for Land Searches) Regulations 1994 (S.I. 1994/1885)
 Gas Safety (Installation and Use) Regulations 1994 (S.I. 1994/1886)
 European Communities (Designation) (No. 3) Order 1994 (S.I. 1994/1887)
 Local Authorities (Armorial Bearings) Order 1994 (S.I. 1994/1888)
 Child Abduction and Custody (Parties to Conventions) (Amendment) (No. 4) Order 1994 (S.I. 1994/1889)
 European Molecular Biology Laboratory (Immunities and Privileges) Order 1994 (S.I. 1994/1890)
 Agriculture (Miscellaneous Provisions) (Northern Ireland) Order 1994 (S.I. 1994/1891)
 Appropriation (No. 2) (Northern Ireland) Order 1994 (S.I. 1994/1892)
 Betting and Lotteries (Northern Ireland) Order 1994 (S.I. 1994/1893)
 Civil Service (Management Functions) (Northern Ireland) Order 1994 (S.I. 1994/1894)
 Immigration (European Economic Area) Order 1994 (S.I. 1994/1895)
 Litter (Northern Ireland) Order 1994 (S.I. 1994/1896)
 Rates (Amendment) (Northern Ireland) Order 1994 (S.I. 1994/1897)
 Social Security (Incapacity for Work) (Northern Ireland) Order 1994 (S.I. 1994/1898)
 Wills and Administration Proceedings (Northern Ireland) Order 1994 (S.I. 1994/1899)
 Contracts (Applicable Law) Act 1990 (Amendment) Order 1994 (S.I. 1994/1900)

1901-2000

 Reciprocal Enforcement of Foreign Judgments (Australia) Order 1994 (S.I. 1994/1901)
 Reciprocal Enforcement of Maintenance Orders (Hague Convention Countries) (Variation) Order 1994 (S.I. 1994/1902)
 Army, Air Force and Naval Discipline Acts (Continuation) Order 1994 (S.I. 1994/1903)
 European Convention on Cinematographic Co-production (Amendment) Order 1994 (S.I. 1994/1904)
 Exempt Charities Order 1994 (S.I. 1994/1905)
 Naval, Military and Air Forces etc. (Disablement and Death) Service Pensions Amendment (No. 2) Order 1994 (S.I. 1994/1906)
 International Transport Conventions Act 1983 (Amendment) Order 1994 (S.I. 1994/1907)
 Trustee Investments (Additional Powers) Order No. 2 1994 (S.I. 1994/1908)
 Local Government Superannuation (Investments) Regulations 1994 (S.I. 1994/1909)
 Special Educational Needs Tribunal Regulations 1994 (S.I. 1994/1910)
 Road Vehicles (Registration and Licensing) (Amendment) (No. 2) Regulations 1994 (S.I. 1994/1911)
 Education (School Performance Information) (Wales) (Amendment) Regulations 1994 (S.I. 1994/1912)
 Aylesbury Vale Community Healthcare National Health Service Trust (Transfer of Trust Property) Order 1994 (S.I. 1994/1913)
 East Yorkshire Hospitals National Health Service Trust (Transfer of Trust Property) Order 1994 (S.I. 1994/1914)
 Enfield Community Care National Health Service Trust (Transfer of Trust Property) Order 1994 (S.I. 1994/1915)
 Leicester General Hospital National Health Service Trust (Transfer of Trust Property) Order 1994 (S.I. 1994/1916)
 Glenfield Hospital National Health Service Trust (Transfer of Trust Property) Order 1994 (S.I. 1994/1917)
 Leicester Royal Infirmary National Health Service Trust (Transfer of Trust Property) Order 1994 (S.I. 1994/1918)
 Milton Keynes Community Health National Health Service Trust (Transfer of Trust Property) Order 1994 (S.I. 1994/1919)
 Milton Keynes General National Health Service Trust (Transfer of Trust Property) Order 1994 (S.I. 1994/1920)
 South West Durham Mental Health National Health Service Trust (Transfer of Trust Property) Order 1994 (S.I. 1994/1921)
 Monopoly References (Alteration of Exclusions) Order 1994 (S.I. 1994/1922)
 Immigration Act 1988 (Commencement No. 3) Order 1994 (S.I. 1994/1923)
 Income-related Benefits Schemes (Miscellaneous Amendments) (No.4) Regulations 1994 (S.I. 1994/1924)
 Housing Benefit (Supply of Information) and Council Tax Benefit (General) Amendment Regulations 1994 (S.I. 1994/1925)
 Prisons and Young Offenders Institutions (Scotland) Rules 1994 (S.I. 1994/1931)
 Medicines (Advertising) Regulations 1994 (S.I. 1994/1932)
 Medicines (Monitoring of Advertising) Regulations 1994 (S.I. 1994/1933)
 Fair Trading Act (Amendment) (Merger Prenotification) Regulations 1994 (S.I. 1994/1934)
 Companies Act 1985 (Audit Exemption) Regulations 1994 (S.I. 1994/1935)
 County Court Fees (Amendment) Order 1994 (S.I. 1994/1936)
 Loch Ewe, West Ross, Scallops Fishery Order 1994 (S.I. 1994/1946)
 Registration of Births and Deaths (Amendment) Regulations 1994 (S.I. 1994/1948)
 River Clyde Catchment Area (Part) Protection Order 1994 (S.I. 1994/1949)
 Food Protection (Emergency Prohibitions) (Paralytic Shellfish Poisoning) Order 1994 (S.I. 1994/1950)
 Criminal Justice Act 1993 (Commencement No. 7) Order 1994 (S.I. 1994/1951)
 Backing of Warrants (Republic of Ireland) (Rule of Speciality) Order 1994 (S.I. 1994/1952)
 Police (Promotion) (Scotland) Amendment Regulations 1994 (S.I. 1994/1953)
 London–Holyhead Trunk Road (A5) (Bangor Bypass Section) (Eastbound On Slip Road from A4087 Caernarfon Road) Order 1994 (S.I. 1994/1972)
 Land Registration Fees Order 1994 (S.I. 1994/1974)
 Rules of the Supreme Court (Amendment) 1994 (S.I. 1994/1975)
 Scottish Development Agency Dissolution Order 1994 (S.I. 1994/1976)
 Food Protection (Emergency Prohibitions) (Paralytic Shellfish Poisoning) (No.2) Order 1994 (S.I. 1994/1977)
 Value Added Tax Tribunals Appeals (Northern Ireland) Order 1994 (S.I. 1994/1978)
 University of Abertay Dundee (Scotland) Order of Council 1994 (S.I. 1994/1980)
 Friendly Societies (Insurance Business) Regulations 1994 (S.I. 1994/1981)
 Friendly Societies (Authorisation) Regulations 1994 (S.I. 1994/1982)
 Friendly Societies (Accounts and Related Provisions) Regulations 1994 (S.I. 1994/1983)
 Friendly Societies Act 1992 (Amendment) Regulations 1994 (S.I. 1994/1984)
 Pesticides (Maximum Residue Levels in Crops, Food and Feeding Stuffs) Regulations 1994 (S.I. 1994/1985)
 Race Relations (Prescribed Public Bodies) (No. 2) Regulations 1994 (S.I. 1994/1986)
 Stonebridge Housing Action Trust (Area and Constitution) Order 1994 (S.I. 1994/1987)
 Merchant Shipping (Salvage and Pollution) Act 1994 (Commencement No. 1) Order 1994 (S.I. 1994/1988)
 Environmentally Sensitive Areas Designation (Radnor) (Welsh Language Provisions) Order 1994 (S.I. 1994/1989)
 Environmentally Sensitive Areas Designation (Ynys Môn) (Welsh Language Provisions) Order 1994 (S.I. 1994/1990)
 Remand (Temporary Provisions) (Northern Ireland) Order 1994 (S.I. 1994/1993)
 Lazy Acres Natural Gas Pipe-lines Order 1994 (S.I. 1994/1994)

2001-2100

 Education (Initial Government of Grant-maintained Special Schools) Regulations 1994 (S.I. 1994/2003)
 Welfare Food Amendment Regulations 1994 (S.I. 1994/2004)
 Railway Pensions (Transfer and Miscellaneous Provisions) Order 1994 (S.I. 1994/2005)
 Ecclesiastical Judges and Legal Officers (Fees) Order 1994 (S.I. 1994/2009)
 Legal Officers (Annual Fees) Order 1994 (S.I. 1994/2010)
 Parochial Fees Order 1994 (S.I. 1994/2011)
 Environmental Assessment (Scotland) Amendment Regulations 1994 (S.I. 1994/2012)
 Merchant Shipping (Accident Reporting and Investigation) Regulations 1994 (S.I. 1994/2013)
 Merchant Shipping (Safety Officials and Reporting of Accidents and Dangerous Occurrences) (Amendment) Regulations 1994 (S.I. 1994/2014)
 Education (Bursaries for Teacher Training) Regulations 1994 (S.I. 1994/2016)
 Education (Norwich School of Art and Design Further Education Corporation) (Transfer to the Higher Education Sector) Order 1994 (S.I. 1994/2017)
 Education (Northern School of Contemporary Dance, Leeds Further Education Corporation) (Transfer to the Higher Education Sector) Order 1994 (S.I. 1994/2018)
 Education (Writtle Agricultural College Further Education Corporation) (Transfer to the Higher Education Sector) Order 1994 (S.I. 1994/2019)
 Building (Prescribed Fees) Regulations 1994 (S.I. 1994/2020)
 Personal Injuries (Civilians) Amendment (No. 2) Scheme 1994 (S.I. 1994/2021)
 General Medical Council (Constitution of Fitness to Practise Committees) (Amendment) Rules Order of Council 1994 (S.I. 1994/2022)
 Police Authorities (Selection Panel) Regulations 1994 (S.I. 1994/2023)
 Police (Number of Members of Police Authorities) Order 1994 (S.I. 1994/2024)
 Police and Magistrates' Courts Act 1994 (Commencement No. 1 and Transitional Provisions) Order 1994 (S.I. 1994/2025)
 Gipsy Encampments (Rushmoor and Hart) Order 1994 (S.I. 1994/2026)
 Food Protection (Emergency Prohibitions) (Paralytic Shellfish Poisoning) (No. 3) Order 1994 (S.I. 1994/2029)
 Local Authorities (Recognised Bodies for Heritable Securities Indemnities) (Scotland) Order 1994 (S.I. 1994/2030)
 Dartford — Thurrock Crossing Regulations 1994 (S.I. 1994/2031)
 Railway Heritage Scheme Order 1994 (S.I. 1994/2032)
 Dartford—Thurrock Crossing Tolls Order 1994 (S.I. 1994/2033)
 Education (Assisted Places) (Amendment) Regulations 1994 (S.I. 1994/2034)
 Education (Assisted Places) (Incidental Expenses) (Amendment) Regulations 1994 (S.I. 1994/2035)
 Education (Grants) (Music and Ballet Schools) (Amendment) Regulations 1994 (S.I. 1994/2036)
 Education Act 1993 (Commencement No. 5 and Transitional Provisions) Order 1994 (S.I. 1994/2038)
 York City Council (Foss Bank Bridge) Scheme 1993 Confirmation Instrument 1994 (S.I. 1994/2040)
 York City Council (Peasholme Green Bridge) Scheme 1993 Confirmation Instrument 1994 (S.I. 1994/2041)
 Buckinghamshire County Council (Marsh Drive Great Linford) (Canal Footbridge) Scheme 1993 Confirmation Instrument 1994 (S.I. 1994/2042)
 Supply of Machinery (Safety) (Amendment) Regulations 1994 (S.I. 1994/2063)
 Tees and Hartlepool Harbour Revision Order 1994 (S.I. 1994/2064)
 Alcan Aluminium UK Ltd. (Rateable Values) (Scotland) Order 1994 (S.I. 1994/2068)
 British Gas plc. (Rateable Values) (Scotland) Order 1994 (S.I. 1994/2069)
 Railways (Rateable Values) (Scotland) Order 1994 (S.I. 1994/2070)
 British Telecommunications plc. (Rateable Values) (Scotland) Order 1994 (S.I. 1994/2071)
 Electricity Generators (Rateable Values) (Scotland) Order 1994 (S.I. 1994/2072)
 Glasgow Underground (Rateable Values) (Scotland) Order 1994 (S.I. 1994/2073)
 Lochaber Power Company (Rateable Values) (Scotland) Order 1994 (S.I. 1994/2074)
 Mercury Communications Ltd. (Rateable Values) (Scotland) Order 1994 (S.I. 1994/2075)
 Scottish Hydro-Electric plc. (Rateable Values) (Scotland) Order 1994 (S.I. 1994/2076)
 Scottish Nuclear Limited (Rateable Values) (Scotland) Order 1994 (S.I. 1994/2077)
 Scottish Power plc. (Rateable Values) (Scotland) Order 1994 (S.I. 1994/2078)
 Water Undertakings (Rateable Values) (Scotland) Order 1994 (S.I. 1994/2079)
 Caledonian MacBrayne Limited (Rateable Values) (Scotland) Order 1994 (S.I. 1994/2080)
 Forth Ports plc (Rateable Values) (Scotland) Order 1994 (S.I. 1994/2081)
 Merchant Shipping (IBC Code) (Amendment) Regulations 1994 (S.I. 1994/2082)
 Merchant Shipping (Control of Pollution by Noxious Liquid Substances in Bulk) (Amendment) Regulations 1994 (S.I. 1994/2083)
 Merchant Shipping (BCH Code) (Amendment) Regulations 1994 (S.I. 1994/2084)
 Merchant Shipping (Prevention of Oil Pollution) (Amendment) Regulations 1994 (S.I. 1994/2085)
 County Council of Norfolk (Reconstruction of Three Holes Bridge–Temporary Bridge) Scheme 1993 Confirmation Instrument 1994 (S.I. 1994/2086)
 County Council of Norfolk (Reconstruction of Three Holes Bridge) Scheme 1993 Confirmation Instrument 1994 (S.I. 1994/2087)
 Education (No. 2) Act 1986 (Amendment) (No. 2) Order 1994 (S.I. 1994/2092)
 Education (Exclusions from Schools) (Prescribed Periods) Regulations 1994 (S.I. 1994/2093)
 Education (Grant-maintained Schools) (Initial Governing Instruments) (Amendment) Regulations 1994 (S.I. 1994/2094)
 Police (Scotland) Amendment Regulations 1994 (S.I. 1994/2095)
 Police Cadets (Scotland) Amendment Regulations 1994 (S.I. 1994/2096)
 Right to Purchase (Prescribed Persons) (Scotland) Amendment Order 1994 (S.I. 1994/2097)
 Education (National Curriculum) (Assessment Arrangements for the Core Subjects) (Key Stage 1) (Amendment) Order 1994 (S.I. 1994/2099)
 Education (National Curriculum) (Assessment Arrangements for the Core Subjects) (Key Stage 2) (England) Order 1994 (S.I. 1994/2100)

2101-2200

 Education (National Curriculum) (Assessment Arrangements for the Core Subjects) (Key Stage 3) (England) Order 1994 (S.I. 1994/2101)
 Education (Grant) (Amendment) Regulations 1994 (S.I. 1994/2102)
 Education (Pupil Referral Units) (Application of Enactments) Regulations 1994 (S.I. 1994/2103)
 Education (Grant-maintained Special Schools) (Initial Governing Instruments) Regulations 1994 (S.I. 1994/2104)
 Local Government (Wales) Act 1994 (Commencement No. 1) Order 1994 (S.I. 1994/2109)
 County Court (Forms) (Amendment No. 2) Rules 1994 (S.I. 1994/2110)
 Education (Grant-maintained Special Schools) (Finance) Regulations 1994 (S.I. 1994/2111)
 Education (National Curriculum) (Exceptions) Regulations 1994 (S.I. 1994/2112)
 Inshore Fishing (Scotland) Act 1994 (Commencement) Order 1994 (S.I. 1994/2124)
 Welfare of Livestock Regulations 1994 (S.I. 1994/2126)
 Preserved Tuna and Bonito (Marketing Standards) Regulations 1994 (S.I. 1994/2127)
 Pupils' Registration (Amendment) Regulations 1994 (S.I. 1994/2128)
 M4 Motorway (Heathrow Airport Spur) (Speed Limit) Regulations 1994 (S.I. 1994/2129)
 Motor Vehicles (Tests) (Amendment) Regulations 1994 (S.I. 1994/2136)
 Housing Benefit and Council Tax Benefit (Miscellaneous Amendments) (No. 2) Regulations 1994 (S.I. 1994/2137)
 Council Tax Benefit (Permitted Total) Order 1994 (S.I. 1994/2138)
 Income-related Benefits Schemes (Miscellaneous Amendments) (No.5) Regulations 1994 (S.I. 1994/2139)
 M27 South Coast Motorway (Ower– Chilworth Section) Connecting Roads Scheme 1970 (Variation) Scheme 1994 (S.I. 1994/2141)
 Railways Act 1993 (Commencement No. 6) Order 1994 (S.I. 1994/2142)
 Finance Act 1994, section 7, (Appointed Day) (No. 2) Order 1994 (S.I. 1994/2143)
 Food Protection (Emergency Prohibitions) (Paralytic Shellfish Poisoning) (No.2) Order 1994 Revocation Order 1994 (S.I. 1994/2144)
 Compulsory Purchase of Land Regulations 1994 (S.I. 1994/2145)
 Railways Pensions Guarantee (Prescribed Persons) Order 1994 (S.I. 1994/2150)
 Police and Magistrates' Courts Act 1994 (Commencement No. 2) Order 1994 (S.I. 1994/2151)
 A1033 Trunk Road (Hedon Road Improvement) Order 1994 (S.I. 1994/2152)
 A1033 Trunk Road (Hedon Road) (Detrunking) Order 1994 (S.I. 1994/2153)
 Local Government Act 1988 (Defined Activities) (Exemption) (Gillingham Borough Council) Order 1994 (S.I. 1994/2154)
 Pig Carcase (Grading) Regulations 1994 (S.I. 1994/2155)
 Education (Payment for Special Educational Needs Supplies) (Amendment) Regulations 1994 (S.I. 1994/2156)
 Medicines (Veterinary Medicinal Products) (Applications for Product Licences) (Amendment) Regulations 1994 (S.I. 1994/2157)
 A47 Trunk Road (Allexton–Belton in Rutland Improvement) Order 1994 (S.I. 1994/2158)
 British Telecommunications (Dissolution) Order 1994 (S.I. 1994/2162)
 Education (Inner London Education Authority) (Property Transfer) (Amendment) (No. 2) Order 1994 (S.I. 1994/2163)
 Children (Allocation of Proceedings) (Amendment) Order 1994 (S.I. 1994/2164)
 Family Proceedings (Amendment) (No. 2) Rules 1994 (S.I. 1994/2165)
 Family Proceedings Courts (Children Act 1989) (Amendment) Rules 1994 (S.I. 1994/2166)
 Education (Publication of Notices) (Special Schools) Regulations 1994 (S.I. 1994/2167)
 Plaice and Sole (Specified Sea Areas) (Prohibition of Fishing) Order 1994 (S.I. 1994/2169)
 County Council of Northumberland (Duplicate Kitty Brewster Bridge) Scheme 1994 Confirmation Instrument 1994 (S.I. 1994/2170)
 Charities (The National Trust for Places of Historic Interest or Natural Beauty) Order 1994 (S.I. 1994/2181)
 Agricultural Holdings (Units of Production) Order 1994 (S.I. 1994/2183)
 Fire Precautions (Sub-surface Railway Stations) (Amendment) Regulations 1994 (S.I. 1994/2184)
 Coal Industry Act 1994 (Commencement No. 1) Order 1994 (S.I. 1994/2189)
 Motor Vehicles (Type Approval) (Great Britain) (Amendment) Regulations 1994 (S.I. 1994/2190)
 Motor Vehicles (Type Approval for Goods Vehicles) (Great Britain) (Amendment) Regulations 1994 (S.I. 1994/2191)
 Road Vehicles (Construction and Use) (Amendment) (No. 3) Regulations 1994 (S.I. 1994/2192)
 Food Protection (Emergency Prohibitions) (Paralytic Shellfish Poisoning) Orders 1994 Revocation Order 1994 (S.I. 1994/2193)
 Social Security (Contributions) Amendment (No. 3) Regulations 1994 (S.I. 1994/2194)
 Police (Amendment) (No. 2) Regulations 1994 (S.I. 1994/2195)
 Local Government Act 1988 (Defined Activities) (Exemption) (Tower Hamlets London Borough Council) Order 1994 (S.I. 1994/2196)

2201-2300

 Education Act 1994 (Commencement) Order 1994 (S.I. 1994/2204)
 Wrexham and East Denbighshire Water Company (Constitution and Regulation) Order 1994 (S.I. 1994/2205)
 Education (National Curriculum) (Exceptions) (Wales) Regulations 1994 (S.I. 1994/2206)
 Fishguard—Bangor Trunk Road (A487) (Pont Seiont Improvement, Caernarfon) Order 1994 (S.I. 1994/2215)
 Free Zone (Port of Tilbury) Designation (Variation) Order 1994 (S.I. 1994/2216)
 Companies (Fees) (Amendment) Regulations 1994 (S.I. 1994/2217)
 Legal Aid in Criminal and Care Proceedings (Costs) (Amendment) (No. 3) Regulations 1994 (S.I. 1994/2218)
 Education (National Curriculum) (Assessment Arrangements for English, Welsh, Mathematics and Science) (Key Stage 1) (Wales) (Amendment) Order 1994 (S.I. 1994/2226)
 Education (National Curriculum) (Assessment Arrangements for English, Welsh, Mathematics and Science) (Key Stage 2) (Wales) Order 1994 (S.I. 1994/2227)
 Education (National Curriculum) (Assessment Arrangements for English, Welsh, Mathematics and Science) (Key Stage 3) (Wales) Order 1994 (S.I. 1994/2228)
 Railways Act 1993 (Consequential Modifications) (No. 3) Order 1994 (S.I. 1994/2229)
 Brancaster Staithe Fishery (Variation) Order 1994 (S.I. 1994/2230)
 Police (Scotland) Amendment (No.2) Regulations 1994 (S.I. 1994/2231)
 Safety of Sports Grounds (Designation) Order 1994 (S.I. 1994/2239)
 Education (Grant-maintained Special Schools) (No. 2) Regulations 1994 (S.I. 1994/2247)
 Education Act 1993 (Commencement No. 5 and Transitional Provisions) (Amendment) Order 1994 (S.I. 1994/2248)
 Marketing of Gas Oil (Sulphur Content) Regulations 1994 (S.I. 1994/2249)
 Wireless Telegraphy (Short Range Devices) (Exemption) (Amendment) Regulations 1994 (S.I. 1994/2250)
 Telecommunications (Leased Lines) (Amendment) Regulations 1994 (S.I. 1994/2251)
 Saundersfoot Harbour Revision Order 1994 (S.I. 1994/2253)
 Education (School Performance Information) (Wales) (No. 2) Regulations 1994 (S.I. 1994/2254)
 Pontefract Hospitals National Health Service Trust (Transfer of Trust Property) Order 1994 (S.I. 1994/2255)
 Wakefield and Pontefract Community Health National Health Service Trust (Transfer of Trust Property) Order 1994 (S.I. 1994/2256)
 Shropshire's Community Health Service National Health Service Trust (Transfer of Trust Property) Order 1994 (S.I. 1994/2257)
 Pinderfields Hospitals National Health Service Trust (Transfer of Trust Property) Order 1994 (S.I. 1994/2258)
 Road Vehicles Lighting (Amendment) Regulations 1994 (S.I. 1994/2280)
 Education (Government of Groups of Grant-maintained Schools) Regulations 1994 (S.I. 1994/2281)
 A23 Trunk Road (Streatham High Road, Lambeth) (Prohibition of Right Turn) Order 1994 (S.I. 1994/2282)
 Organic Products (Amendment) Regulations 1994 (S.I. 1994/2286)
 Arable Area Payments (Amendment) Regulations 1994 (S.I. 1994/2287)
 National Health Service (District Health Authorities) (No. 3) Order 1994 (S.I. 1994/2288)
 National Health Service (Determination of Districts) (No. 3) Order 1994 (S.I. 1994/2289)
 Motor Fuel (Composition and Content) Regulations 1994 (S.I. 1994/2295)
 Local Government Act 1988 (Defined Activities) (Exemptions) (England and Wales) (Amendment) Order 1994 (S.I. 1994/2296)
 Local Government Act 1988 (Competition) (Housing Management) (England) Regulations 1994 (S.I. 1994/2297)
 Ventnor Harbour Revision Order 1994 (S.I. 1994/2298)
 Social Security (Contributions) Amendment (No. 4) Regulations 1994 (S.I. 1994/2299)

2301-2400

 Act of Sederunt (Rules of the Court of Session 1994 Amendment No.1) (Commercial Actions) 1994 (S.I. 1994/2310)
 Income Tax (Authorised Unit Trusts) (Interest Distributions) Regulations 1994 (S.I. 1994/2318)
 Social Security (Claims and Payments) Amendment Regulations 1994 (S.I. 1994/2319)
 Civil Aviation (Canadian Navigation Services) Regulations 1994 (S.I. 1994/2325)
 Personal Protective Equipment (EC Directive) (Amendment) Regulations 1994 (S.I. 1994/2326)
 European Economic Interest Grouping (Fees) (Amendment) Regulations 1994 (S.I. 1994/2327)
 General Product Safety Regulations 1994 (S.I. 1994/2328)
 Thames Estuary Cockle Fishery Order 1994 (S.I. 1994/2329)
 Education (School Information) (Wales) Regulations 1994 (S.I. 1994/2330)
 Police (Amendment) (No. 3) Regulations 1994 (S.I. 1994/2331)
 Nottingham Community Health National Health Service Trust (Transfer of Trust Property) Order 1994 (S.I. 1994/2332)
 Nottingham Healthcare National Health Service Trust (Transfer of Trust Property) Order 1994 (S.I. 1994/2333)
 Nottingham City Hospital National Health Service Trust (Transfer of Trust Property) Order 1994 (S.I. 1994/2334)
 Allington National Health Service Trust (Transfer of Trust Property) Order 1994 (S.I. 1994/2335)
 Bexley Community Health National Health Service Trust (Transfer of Trust Property) Order 1994 (S.I. 1994/2336)
 North Staffordshire Hospital Centre National Health Service Trust (Transfer of Trust Property) Order 1994 (S.I. 1994/2337)
 East Suffolk Local Health Services National Health Service Trust (Transfer of Trust Property) Order 1994 (S.I. 1994/2338)
 Ipswich Hospital National Health Service Trust (Transfer of Trust Property) Order 1994 (S.I. 1994/2339)
 Ealing Hospital National Health Service Trust (Transfer of Trust Property) Order 1994 (S.I. 1994/2340)
 Mid Anglia Community Health National Health Service Trust (Transfer of Trust Property) Order 1994 (S.I. 1994/2341)
 Nottinghamshire Ambulance Service National Health Service Trust (Transfer of Trust Property) Order 1994 (S.I. 1994/2342)
 Social Security (Industrial Injuries) (Prescribed Diseases) Amendment Regulations 1994 (S.I. 1994/2343)
 Countryside Access Regulations 1994 (S.I. 1994/2349)
 Town and Country Planning (Control of Advertisements) (Amendment) Regulations 1994 (S.I. 1994/2351)
 Public Record Office (Fees) Regulations 1994 (S.I. 1994/2353)
 Act of Sederunt (Judicial Factors Rules) (Amendment) 1994 (S.I. 1994/2354)
 Redbridge Health Care National Health Service Trust (Transfer of Trust Property) Order 1994 (S.I. 1994/2357)
 Royal Shrewsbury Hospitals National Health Service Trust (Transfer of Trust Property) Order 1994 (S.I. 1994/2358)
 Worthing Priority Care National Health Service Trust (Transfer of Trust Property) Order 1994 (S.I. 1994/2359)
 Rotherham Priority Health Services National Health Service Trust (Transfer of Trust Property) Order 1994 (S.I. 1994/2360)
 West Cumbria Health Care National Health Service Trust (Transfer of Trust Property) Order 1994 (S.I. 1994/2361)
 South Warwickshire General Hospitals National Health Service Trust (Transfer of Trust Property) Order 1994 (S.I. 1994/2362)
 Basildon and Thurrock General Hospitals National Health Service Trust (Transfer of Trust Property) Order 1994 (S.I. 1994/2363)
 Robert Jones and Agnes Hunt Orthopaedic and District Hospital National Health Service Trust (Transfer of Trust Property) Order 1994 (S.I. 1994/2364)
 Rotherham General Hospital's National Health Service Trust (Transfer of Trust Property) Order 1994 (S.I. 1994/2365)
 Calderdale Healthcare National Health Service Trust (Transfer of Trust Property) Order 1994 (S.I. 1994/2366)
 Thameside Community Health Care National Health Service Trust (Transfer of Trust Property) Order 1994 (S.I. 1994/2367)
 Cornwall Healthcare National Health Service Trust (Transfer of Trust Property) (No. 3) Order 1994 (S.I. 1994/2368)
 Queen Mary's Sidcup National Health Service Trust (Transfer of Trust Property) Order 1994 (S.I. 1994/2369)
 West Suffolk Hospitals National Health Service Trust (Transfer of Trust Property) Order 1994 (S.I. 1994/2370)
 Queen Margaret College, Edinburgh (Scotland) Order of Council 1994 (S.I. 1994/2371)
 Protection of Wrecks (MV Braer) (Revocation) Order 1994 (S.I. 1994/2372)
 National Assistance (Assessment of Resources) (Amendment No. 2) Regulations 1994 (S.I. 1994/2386)
 Education (School Information) (England) (Amendment) Regulations 1994 (S.I. 1994/2387)
 Railway Pensions (Substitution) Order 1994 (S.I. 1994/2388)
 A628/A616 Trunk Road (Flouch Junction Improvement and Detrunking) Order 1994 (S.I. 1994/2390)

2401-2500

 National Health Service (Pharmaceutical Services and Charges for Drugs and Appliances) Amendment Regulations 1994 (S.I. 1994/2402)
 County Court (Amendment No. 3) Rules 1994 (S.I. 1994/2403)
 Potato Marketing Scheme (Amendment) Order 1994 (S.I. 1994/2404)
 A550 and A5117 Trunk Roads (Improvement between Deeside Park and Ledsham) and Connecting Roads Order 1994 (S.I. 1994/2405)
 A550 Trunk Road (Improvement between Deeside Park and Ledsham) (Detrunking) Order 1994 (S.I. 1994/2406)
 Medicinal Products: Prescription by Nurses etc. Act 1992 (Commencement No. 1) Order 1994 (S.I. 1994/2408)
 Medicines (Pharmacy and General Sale— Exemption) Amendment Order 1994 (S.I. 1994/2409)
 Medicines (Products Other Than Veterinary Drugs) (General Sale List) Amendment Order 1994 (S.I. 1994/2410)
 Medicines (Sale or Supply) (Miscellaneous Provisions) Amendment Regulations 1994 (S.I. 1994/2411)
 Bridgend and District National Health Service Trust (Transfer of Trust Property) Order 1994 (S.I. 1994/2412)
 M606 Motorway (Staygate Extension) Scheme 1994 (S.I. 1994/2413)
 A417 Trunk Road (North of Stratton to Nettleton Improvement) Order 1994 (S.I. 1994/2414)
 A417 Trunk Road (North of Stratton to Nettleton Improvement) (Detrunking) Order 1994 (S.I. 1994/2415)
 A417 Trunk Road (Daglingworth Quarry Junction) Order 1994 (S.I. 1994/2416)
 A417 Trunk Road (Daglingworth Quarry Junction) (Detrunking) Order 1994 (S.I. 1994/2417)
 A419/A417 Trunk Road (Cirencester and Stratton Bypass and Slip Roads) Order 1994 (S.I. 1994/2418)
 A419/A417 Trunk Road (Cirencester and Stratton Bypass and Slip Roads) (Detrunking) Order 1994 (S.I. 1994/2419)
 Consumer Credit (Exempt Agreements) (Amendment) Order 1994 (S.I. 1994/2420)
 Insolvent Partnerships Order 1994 (S.I. 1994/2421)
 Local Government (Publication of Manpower Information) (England) (Revocation) Regulations 1994 (S.I. 1994/2422)
 Education (Grants for Education Support and Training) (Amendment) Regulations 1994 (S.I. 1994/2446)
 Dairy Produce Quotas (Amendment) Regulations 1994 (S.I. 1994/2448)
 Building Societies (Designation of Qualifying Bodies) (Amendment) Order 1994 (S.I. 1994/2457)
 Building Societies (Aggregation) (Amendment) Rules 1994 (S.I. 1994/2458)
 Building Societies (Accounts and Related Provisions) (Amendment) Regulations 1994 (S.I. 1994/2459)
 Milk Marketing Board Scheme of Reorganisation (Third Party Rights) Regulations 1994 (S.I. 1994/2460)
 M1 Motorway (Junction 1, Barnet) (Speed Limit) Regulations 1994 (S.I. 1994/2461)
 City Council of Sheffield (Broughton Lane Bridge) Scheme 1993 Confirmation Instrument 1994 (S.I. 1994/2462)
 Teaching as a Career Unit (Transfer of Property, Rights and Liabilities) Order 1994 (S.I. 1994/2463)
 Merchant Shipping (Gas Carriers) Regulations 1994 (S.I. 1994/2464)
 Animals, Meat and Meat Products (Examination for Residues and Maximum Residue Limits) (Amendment) Regulations 1994 (S.I. 1994/2465)
 Channel Tunnel (Shop and Liquor Licensing Hours Requirements) (Disapplication) Order 1994 (S.I. 1994/2478)
 Maternity (Compulsory Leave) Regulations 1994 (S.I. 1994/2479)
Act of Sederunt (Registration Appeal Court) 1994 (S.I. 1994/2483)
 Royal Scottish National Hospital and Community National Health Service Trust (Dissolution) Order 1994 (S.I. 1994/2484)
 Central Scotland Healthcare National Health Service Trust (Appointment of Trustees) Order 1994 (S.I. 1994/2485)
 A4 Trunk Road (Great West Road, Hounslow) (Prescribed Routes) Order 1994 (S.I. 1994/2486)
 Environmental Protection Act 1990 (Commencement No. 15) (Amendment) Order 1994 (S.I. 1994/2487)
 Roads (Traffic Calming) (Scotland) Regulations 1994 (S.I. 1994/2488)

2501-2600

 Insolvency Regulations 1994 (S.I. 1994/2507)
 Finance Act 1989, section 165(2), (Appointed Day) Order 1994 (S.I. 1994/2508)
 Free Zone (Birmingham Airport) (Substitution of Responsible Authority) Order 1994 (S.I. 1994/2509)
 Feeding Stuffs (Amendment) (No. 2) Regulations 1994 (S.I. 1994/2510)
 A1 Trunk Road (Wetherby to Kirk Deighton New Junction and Connecting Roads) Order 1994 (S.I. 1994/2515)
 A1 Trunk Road (Wetherby to Walshford) (Detrunking) Order 1994 (S.I. 1994/2516)
 A1 Motorway (Kirk Deighton New Junction to Walshford Section and Connecting Roads) Scheme 1994 (S.I. 1994/2517)
 Export of Goods (Control) Order 1994 (Amendment No. 2) Order 1994 (S.I. 1994/2518)
 Public Trustee (Custodian Trustee) Rules 1994 (S.I. 1994/2519)
 Railways Act 1993 (Consequential Modifications) (No. 4) Order 1994 (S.I. 1994/2520)
 Aintree Hospitals National Health Service Trust (Transfer of Trust Property) Order 1994 (S.I. 1994/2521)
 Chesterfield and North Derbyshire Royal Hospital National Health Service Trust (Establishment) Amendment Order 1994 (S.I. 1994/2522)
 Salmon (Fish Passes and Screens) (Scotland) Regulations 1994 (S.I. 1994/2524)
 Broadcasting (Restrictive Trade Practices Act 1976) (Exemption for Networking Arrangements) Order 1994 (S.I. 1994/2540)
 Insolvency Fees (Amendment) Order 1994 (S.I. 1994/2541)
 Value Added Tax Act 1994 (Interest on Tax) (Prescribed Rate) Order 1994 (S.I. 1994/2542)
 Friendly Societies Act 1992 (Commencement No. 8) Order 1994 (S.I. 1994/2543)
 Bovine Offal (Prohibition) (Scotland) Amendment Regulations 1994 (S.I. 1994/2544)
 Trade Marks and Service Marks (Amendment) Rules 1994 (S.I. 1994/2549)
 Trade Marks Act 1994 (Commencement) Order 1994 (S.I. 1994/2550)
 Trade Marks and Service Marks (Forms) (Amendment) Rules 1994 (S.I. 1994/2551)
 Coal Industry Act 1994 (Commencement No. 2 and Transitional Provision) Order 1994 (S.I. 1994/2552)
 Coal Industry (Restructuring Date) Order 1994 (S.I. 1994/2553)
 Food Protection (Emergency Prohibitions) (Oil and Chemical Pollution of Fish) (No.2) Order 1993 (Partial Revocation No. 3) Order 1994 (S.I. 1994/2555)
 Social Security (Severe Disablement Allowance and Invalid Care Allowance) Amendment Regulations 1994 (S.I. 1994/2556)
 Coal Industry (Retained Copyhold Interests) Regulations 1994 (S.I. 1994/2562)
 Coal Mining Subsidence (Subsidence Adviser) Regulations 1994 (S.I. 1994/2563)
 Coal Mining Subsidence (Blight and Compensation for Inconvenience During Works) Regulations 1994 (S.I. 1994/2564)
 Coal Mining Subsidence (Provision of Information) Regulations 1994 (S.I. 1994/2565)
 Coal Mining Subsidence (Arbitration Schemes) Regulations 1994 (S.I. 1994/2566)
 Coal Industry Act 1994 (Consequential Modifications of Subordinate Legislation) Order 1994 (S.I. 1994/2567)
 Gas (Exempt Supplies) Act 1993 (Commencement) Order 1994 (S.I. 1994/2568)
 Insurance Brokers Registration Council (Code of Conduct) Approval Order 1994 (S.I. 1994/2569)
 British Coal Staff Superannuation Scheme (Modification) Regulations 1994 (S.I. 1994/2576)
 Mineworkers' Pension Scheme (Modification) Regulations 1994 (S.I. 1994/2577)
 London Docklands Development Corporation (Alteration of Boundaries) Order 1994 (S.I. 1994/2578)
 General Optical Council (Companies Committee Rules) Order of Council 1994 (S.I. 1994/2579)
 Trade Marks and Service Marks (Fees) (Amendment) Rules 1994 (S.I. 1994/2581)
 Trade Marks and Service Marks (Forms) (Revocation) Rules 1994 (S.I. 1994/2582)
 Trade Marks Rules 1994 (S.I. 1994/2583)
 Trade Marks (Fees) Rules 1994 (S.I. 1994/2584)
 Town and Country Planning (General Development Procedure) (Scotland) Amendment Order 1994 (S.I. 1994/2585)
 Town and Country Planning (General Permitted Development) (Scotland) Amendment (No. 2) Order 1994 (S.I. 1994/2586)
 National Health Service (Optical Charges and Payments) (Scotland) Amendment (No.3) Regulations 1994 (S.I. 1994/2587)
 Land Registration (Scotland) Act 1979 (Commencement No. 8) Order 1994 (S.I. 1994/2588)
 Aberdeen and District Milk Marketing Board (Residual Functions) Regulations 1994 (S.I. 1994/2589)
 North of Scotland Milk Marketing Board (Residual Functions) Regulations 1994 (S.I. 1994/2590)
 Scottish Milk Marketing Board (Residual Functions) Regulations 1994 (S.I. 1994/2591)
 Seed Potatoes (Amendment) Regulations 1994 (S.I. 1994/2592)
 Social Fund Cold Weather Payments (General) Amendment Regulations 1994 (S.I. 1994/2593)
 Police and Magistrates' Courts Act 1994 (Commencement No. 3 and Transitional Provisions) Order 1994 (S.I. 1994/2594)
 Town and Country Planning General Development (Amendment) (No. 2) Order 1994 (S.I. 1994/2595)

2601-2700

 Inshore Fishing (Prohibition of Fishing for Cockles) (Scotland) (No.2) Order 1994 (S.I. 1994/2613)
 Firearms (Period of Certificate) Order 1994 (S.I. 1994/2614)
 Firearms (Variation of Fees) Order 1994 (S.I. 1994/2615)
 Solicitors' (Non-Contentious Business) Remuneration Order 1994 (S.I. 1994/2616)
 Value Added Tax Tribunals (Amendment) Rules 1994 (S.I. 1994/2617)
 Dumfries and Galloway College of Technology (Change of Name) (Scotland) Order 1994 (S.I. 1994/2618)
 National Health Service (Optical Charges and Payments) Amendment (No. 3) Regulations 1994 (S.I. 1994/2619)
 National Health Service (General Medical Services) Amendment (No. 2) Regulations 1994 (S.I. 1994/2620)
 Rivers Tweed and Eye Protection (Renewal) Order 1991 Variation Order 1994 (S.I. 1994/2621)
 River Lunan Catchment Area Protection (Renewal) Order 1991 Variation Order 1994 (S.I. 1994/2622)
 River Tummel Catchment Area Protection (Renewal) Order 1991 Variation Order 1994 (S.I. 1994/2623)
 National Health Service (General Medical and Pharmaceutical Services) (Scotland) Amendment (No.2) Regulations 1994 (S.I. 1994/2624)
 Trade Marks (Customs) Regulations 1994 (S.I. 1994/2625)
 Civil Courts (Amendment No. 3) Order 1994 (S.I. 1994/2626)
 Spongiform Encephalopathy (Miscellaneous Amendments) Order 1994 (S.I. 1994/2627)
 Bovine Offal (Prohibition) (Amendment) Regulations 1994 (S.I. 1994/2628)
 A12 Trunk Road (Lowestoft Eastern Relief Road) (Trunking and Detrunking) Order 1994 (S.I. 1994/2651)
 Firearms (Variation of Fees) (Scotland) Order 1994 (S.I. 1994/2652)
 Motor Vehicles (Competitions and Trials) (Scotland) Amendment Regulations 1994 (S.I. 1994/2653)
 Public Telecommunication System Designation (Comment Cablevision Wearside Partnership) Order 1994 (S.I. 1994/2654)
 Public Telecommunication System Designation (Racal Network Services Limited) Order 1994 (S.I. 1994/2655)
 Capital Gains Tax (Gilt-edged Securities) Order 1994 (S.I. 1994/2656)
 Taxes (Interest Rate) (Amendment No. 3) Regulations 1994 (S.I. 1994/2657)
 National Health Service and Community Care Act 1990 (Commencement No. 11) (Scotland) Order 1994 (S.I. 1994/2658)
 National Lottery etc. Act 1993 (Commencement No. 3) Order 1994 (S.I. 1994/2659)
 Cardiff—Glan Conwy Trunk Road (A470) (Nant Crew Improvement) Order 1994 (S.I. 1994/2660)
 Former Yugoslavia (United Nations Sanctions) Order 1994 (S.I. 1994/2673)
 Former Yugoslavia (United Nations Sanctions) (Dependent Territories) Order 1994 (S.I. 1994/2674)
 Former Yugoslavia (United Nations Sanctions) (Channel Islands) Order 1994 (S.I. 1994/2675)
 Former Yugoslavia (United Nations Sanctions) (Isle of Man) Order 1994 (S.I. 1994/2676)
 Local Government (Publication of Manpower Information) (Wales) (Revocation) Regulations 1994 (S.I. 1994/2677)
 Police (Secretary of State's Objectives) Order 1994 (S.I. 1994/2678)
 Finance Act 1994, Part I, (Appointed Day etc.) Order 1994 (S.I. 1994/2679)
 Valuation for Rating (Plant and Machinery) Regulations 1994 (S.I. 1994/2680)
 Social Security (Adjudication) Amendment (No. 2) Regulations 1994 (S.I. 1994/2686)
 Addenbrooke's National Health Service Trust (Transfer of Trust Property) Order 1994 (S.I. 1994/2687)
 Crawley Horsham National Health Service Trust (Transfer of Trust Property) Order 1994 (S.I. 1994/2688)
 East Anglian Ambulance National Health Service Trust (Transfer of Trust Property) Order 1994 (S.I. 1994/2689)
 East Birmingham Hospital National Health Service Trust (Establishment) Amendment Order 1994 (S.I. 1994/2690)
 Hinchingbrooke Health Care National Health Service Trust (Transfer of Trust Property) Order 1994 (S.I. 1994/2691)
 Kingston and District Community National Health Service Trust (Transfer of Trust Property) Order 1994 (S.I. 1994/2692)
 Lincoln District Healthcare National Health Service Trust (Transfer of Trust Property) Order 1994 (S.I. 1994/2693)
 Louth and District Healthcare National Health Service Trust (Transfer of Trust Property) Order 1994 (S.I. 1994/2694)
 Community Health Care Service (North Derbyshire) National Health Service Trust (Transfer of Trust Property) Order 1994 (S.I. 1994/2695)
 Northwick Park and St. Mark's National Health Service Trust (Transfer of Trust Property) Order 1994 (S.I. 1994/2696)
 Papworth Hospital National Health Service Trust (Transfer of Trust Property) Order 1994 (S.I. 1994/2697)
 St George's Healthcare National Health Service Trust (Transfer of Trust Property) Order 1994 (S.I. 1994/2698)
 Teachers' Superannuation (Scotland) Amendment Regulations 1994 (S.I. 1994/2699)

2701-2800

 Harrow and Hillingdon Healthcare National Health Service Trust (Transfer of Trust Property) (No. 2) Order 1994 (S.I. 1994/2708)
 Papworth Hospital National Health Service Trust (Transfer of Trust Property) (No. 2) Order 1994 (S.I. 1994/2709)
 Habitats (Scotland) Regulations 1994 (S.I. 1994/2710)
 Export of Goods (Control) Order 1994 (Amendment No. 3) Order 1994 (S.I. 1994/2711)
 Conservation (Natural Habitats, &c.) Regulations 1994 (S.I. 1994/2716)
 Apple Orchard Grubbing Up (Amendment) Regulations 1994 (S.I. 1994/2731)
 Education (No. 2) Act 1986 (Amendment) (No. 3) Order 1994 (S.I. 1994/2732)
 Portsmouth Mile End Quay (Continental Ferry Port Phase 7) Harbour Revision Order 1994 (S.I. 1994/2733)
 Intelligence Services Act 1994 (Commencement) Order 1994 (S.I. 1994/2734)
 Road Vehicles (Registration and Licensing) (Amendment) Regulations (Northern Ireland) 1994 (S.I. 1994/2735)
 Welsh Language (Names for Police Authorities in Wales) Order 1994 (S.I. 1994/2736)
 Hill Livestock (Compensatory Allowances) Regulations 1994 (S.I. 1994/2740)
 Sheep Annual Premium (Amendment) Regulations 1994 (S.I. 1994/2741)
 Local Government Act 1988 (Defined Activities) (Exemption) (Gateshead Borough Council) Order 1994 (S.I. 1994/2744)
 Shetland Islands Council (Laxa Burn, Mid Yell) (Amendment) Water Order 1994 (S.I. 1994/2758)
 Milk Marketing Board (Residuary Functions) Regulations 1994 (S.I. 1994/2759)
 Brucellosis (England and Wales) (Amendment) Order 1994 (S.I. 1994/2762)
 Housing Renovation etc. Grants (Prescribed Forms and Particulars) (Welsh Forms and Particulars) (Amendment) Regulations 1994 (S.I. 1994/2765)
 Parental Orders (Human Fertilisation and Embryology) Regulations 1994 (S.I. 1994/2767)
 Legal Aid (Scope) Regulations 1994 (S.I. 1994/2768)
 Brucellosis (Scotland) Amendment Order 1994 (S.I. 1994/2770)
 Isles of Scilly (National Health Service) Order 1994 (S.I. 1994/2773)
 Teachers' Superannuation (Amendment) (No. 2) Regulations 1994 (S.I. 1994/2774)
 Food Safety (Live Bivalve Molluscs and Other Shellfish) (Import Conditions and Miscellaneous Amendments) Regulations 1994 (S.I. 1994/2782)
 Food Safety (Fishery Products) (Import Conditions and Miscellaneous Amendments) Regulations 1994 (S.I. 1994/2783)
 Liverpool Obstetric and Gynaecology Services National Health Service Trust (Change of Name) Order 1994 (S.I. 1994/2784)
 Road Traffic (Special Parking Areas) (London Borough of Barnet) (Amendment) Order 1994 (S.I. 1994/2785)
 Road Traffic (Special Parking Areas) (London Borough of Wandsworth) (Amendment) Order 1994 (S.I. 1994/2786)
 London North Circular Trunk Road (A406) (Barnet, Brent and Ealing) (Speed Limits) Order 1994 (S.I. 1994/2787)
 Merchant Shipping (Sterling Equivalents) (Revocation) Order 1994 (S.I. 1994/2788)
 Merchant Shipping Act 1979 (Commencement No. 14) Order 1994 (S.I. 1994/2789)
 Local Government (Wales) Act 1994 (Commencement No 2) Order 1994 (S.I. 1994/2790)
 European Communities (Designation) (No. 4) Order 1994 (S.I. 1994/2791)
 Child Abduction and Custody (Parties to Conventions) (Amendment) (No. 5) Order 1994 (S.I. 1994/2792)
 Consular Fees Order 1994 (S.I. 1994/2793)
 Extradition (Drug Trafficking) (Certain Territories) Order 1994 (S.I. 1994/2794)
 Criminal Justice (Northern Ireland) Order 1994 (S.I. 1994/2795)
 European Convention on Extradition (Bulgaria) (Amendment) Order 1994 (S.I. 1994/2796)
 Former Yugoslavia (United Nations Sanctions) (Channel Islands) (Amendment) Order 1994 (S.I. 1994/2797)
 Summer Time Order 1994 (S.I. 1994/2798)
 Child Abduction and Custody Act 1985 (Isle of Man) Order 1994 (S.I. 1994/2799)
 Family Law Act 1986 (Dependent Territories) (Amendment) Order 1994 (S.I. 1994/2800)

2801-2900

 A19 Trunk Road (Portrack Roundabout) (Trunking) Order 1994 (S.I. 1994/2801)
 Social Security (Jersey and Guernsey) Order 1994 (S.I. 1994/2802)
 Trade Marks (Claims to Priority from Relevant Countries) Order 1994 (S.I. 1994/2803)
 Parental Orders (Human Fertilisation and Embryology) (Scotland) Regulations 1994 (S.I. 1994/2804)
 Act of Sederunt (Sheriff Court Parental Orders (Human Fertilisation and Embryology) Rules) 1994 (S.I. 1994/2805)
 Act of Sederunt (Rules of the Court of Session 1994 Amendment No.2) (Human Fertilisation and Embryology) (Parental Orders) 1994 (S.I. 1994/2806)
 Ports (Northern Ireland) Order 1994 (S.I. 1994/2809)
 Ports (Northern Ireland Consequential Provisions) Order 1994 (S.I. 1994/2810)
 Magistrates' Courts Committees (Constitution) Regulations 1994 (S.I. 1994/2811)
 Local Government (Magistrates' Courts etc.) (Amendment) Order 1994 (S.I. 1994/2812)
 Sea Fishing (Licences and Notices) Regulations 1994 (S.I. 1994/2813)
 Local Government Changes for England (Finance) Regulations 1994 (S.I. 1994/2825)
 Local Government Changes for England (Calculation of Council Tax Base) Regulations 1994 (S.I. 1994/2826)
 Urban Waste Water Treatment (England and Wales) Regulations 1994 (S.I. 1994/2841)
 Urban Waste Water Treatment (Scotland) Regulations 1994 (S.I. 1994/2842)
 Welsh Principal Councils (Day of Election) Order 1994 (S.I. 1994/2843)
 Dangerous Substances and Preparations (Safety) (Consolidation) Regulations 1994 (S.I. 1994/2844)
 Shetland Islands Council Harbour Revision Order 1994 (S.I. 1994/2846)
 Environmental Protection (Authorisation of Processes) (Determination Periods) (Amendment) Order 1994 (S.I. 1994/2847)
 Education (Special Schools Conducted by Education Associations) (Amendment) Regulations 1994 (S.I. 1994/2848)
 Education (Schools Conducted by Education Associations) (Initial Articles of Government) Regulations 1994 (S.I. 1994/2849)
 Local Government etc. (Scotland) Act 1994 (Commencement No.1) Order 1994 (S.I. 1994/2850)
 Reconstitution of the Buckingham Internal Drainage Board Order 1994 (S.I. 1994/2851)
 Medicines (Standard Provisions for Manufacturer's Licences for Veterinary Medicinal Products) Regulations 1994 (S.I. 1994/2852)
 Beef Carcase (Classification) (Amendment) Regulations 1994 (S.I. 1994/2853)
 Environmental Protection Act 1990 (Commencement No. 16) Order 1994 (S.I. 1994/2854)
 Management of Health and Safety at Work (Amendment) Regulations 1994 (S.I. 1994/2865)
 Weights and Measures Act 1985 (Metrication) (Amendment) Order 1994 (S.I. 1994/2866)
 Units of Measurement Regulations 1994 (S.I. 1994/2867)
 Weights and Measures (Metrication) (Miscellaneous Goods) (Amendment) Order 1994 (S.I. 1994/2868)
 Teachers' Superannuation (Amendment) (No. 3) Regulations 1994 (S.I. 1994/2876)
 Merger Reference (Thomas Cook Group Limited and Barclays Bank plc) Order 1994 (S.I. 1994/2877)
 Companies Act 1985 (Audit Exemption) (Amendment) Regulations 1994 (S.I. 1994/2879)
 Commonwealth Development Corporation (Additional Enterprises) Order 1994 (S.I. 1994/2880)
 Local Government Act 1988 (Competition) (Defined Activities) Order 1994 (S.I. 1994/2884)
 A13 Trunk Road (Tower Hamlets) (Bus Lanes) Traffic Order 1994 (S.I. 1994/2887)
 Local Government Act 1988 (Competition) (Defined Activities) (Construction and Property Services) Order 1994 (S.I. 1994/2888)
 Alternative Names in Welsh Order 1994 (S.I. 1994/2889)
 Family Proceedings (Amendment) (No. 3) Rules 1994 (S.I. 1994/2890)
 Occupational Pensions (Revaluation) Order 1994 (S.I. 1994/2891)
 Civil Courts (Amendment No. 4) Order 1994 (S.I. 1994/2893)
 Sheep Annual Premium and Suckler Cow Premium Quotas (Amendment) Regulations 1994 (S.I. 1994/2894)
 Housing Associations (Permissible Additional Purposes) (England and Wales) Order 1994 (S.I. 1994/2895)
 Education (Groups of Grant-maintained Schools) (Initial Governing Instruments) Regulations 1994 (S.I. 1994/2896)
 A419 Trunk Road (Latton Bypass and Slip Roads) Order 1994 (S.I. 1994/2897)
 Free Zone (Port of Sheerness) Designation Order 1994 (S.I. 1994/2898)
 Gaming Clubs (Bankers' Games) Regulations 1994 (S.I. 1994/2899)
 Milk Marketing Schemes (Certification of Revocation) (Scotland) Order 1994 (S.I. 1994/2900)

2901-3000

 Act of Sederunt (Rules of the Court of Session 1994 Amendment No.3) (Miscellaneous) 1994 (S.I. 1994/2901)
 Alcoholic Liquor Duties (Beer-based Beverages) Order 1994 (S.I. 1994/2904)
 Value Added Tax (Increase of Registration Limits) Order 1994 (S.I. 1994/2905)
 A259 Trunk Road (A20 Castle Hill Interchange To A260 Canterbury Road Roundabout, Folkestone) Order 1994 (S.I. 1994/2912)
 A419 Trunk Road (Latton Bypass and Slip Roads) (Detrunking) Order 1994 (S.I. 1994/2913)
 Statistics of Trade (Customs and Excise) (Amendment) Regulations 1994 (S.I. 1994/2914)
 Wrexham and East Denbighshire and Chester (Pipelaying and Other Works) (Codes of Practice) Order 1994 (S.I. 1994/2915)
 Housing (Change of Landlord) (Payment of Disposal Cost by Instalments) (Amendment No. 2) Regulations 1994 (S.I. 1994/2916)
 Dairy Produce Quotas (Amendment) (No. 2) Regulations 1994 (S.I. 1994/2919)
 Importation of Animal Products and Poultry Products (Amendment) Order 1994 (S.I. 1994/2920)
 Milk Marketing Scheme (Certification of Revocation) Order 1994 (S.I. 1994/2921)
 Agricultural Marketing Act 1958 Part I (Certification of Cessation of Effect in Relation to Milk) Order 1994 (S.I. 1994/2922)
 Teachers' Superannuation (Additional Voluntary Contributions) Regulations 1994 (S.I. 1994/2924)
 Social Security (Incapacity for Work) Act 1994 (Commencement) Order 1994 (S.I. 1994/2926)
 Suspension from Work (on Maternity Grounds) Order 1994 (S.I. 1994/2930)
 Housing (Right to Buy Delay Procedure) (Prescribed Forms) (Welsh Forms) Regulations 1994 (S.I. 1994/2931)
 Housing (Right to Buy) (Prescribed Forms) (Welsh Forms) Regulations 1994 (S.I. 1994/2932)
 Criminal Justice and Public Order Act 1994 (Commencement No. 1) Order 1994 (S.I. 1994/2935)
 Medicines (Pharmacies) (Applications for Registration and Fees) Amendment Regulations 1994 (S.I. 1994/2936)
 Social Security (Claims and Payments) Amendment (No. 2) Regulations 1994 (S.I. 1994/2943)
 Social Security (Claims and Payments) Amendment (No. 3) Regulations 1994 (S.I. 1994/2944)
 Social Security (Incapacity Benefit — Increases for Dependants) Regulations 1994 (S.I. 1994/2945)
 Social Security (Incapacity Benefit) Regulations 1994 (S.I. 1994/2946)
 Social Security (Severe Disablement Allowance) Amendment Regulations 1994 (S.I. 1994/2947)
 A4 Trunk Road (Bath Road and Colnbrook By-Pass, Hillingdon) (50 mph Speed Limit) Order 1994 (S.I. 1994/2948)
 Blackpool Victoria Hospital National Health Service Trust (Transfer of Trust Property) Order 1994 (S.I. 1994/2950)
 Blackpool, Wyre and Fylde Community Health Services National Health Service Trust (Transfer of Trust Property) Order 1994 (S.I. 1994/2951)
 Parkside National Health Service Trust (Transfer of Trust Property) (No. 2) Order 1994 (S.I. 1994/2952)
 Merger Reference (Thomas Cook Group Limited and Barclays Bank plc) (No.2) Order 1994 (S.I. 1994/2953)
 Health Service Commissioner for England (National Blood Authority) Order 1994 (S.I. 1994/2954)
 Intelligence Services Act 1994 (Channel Islands) Order 1994 (S.I. 1994/2955)
 Exempt Charities (No. 2) Order 1994 (S.I. 1994/2956)
 Education (Chief Inspector of Schools in Wales) Order 1994 (S.I. 1994/2957)
 Local Government Staff Commission (Scotland) Order 1994 (S.I. 1994/2958)
 Local Authorities (Funds) (Wales) (Amendment) Regulations 1994 (S.I. 1994/2964)
 Diseases of Animals (Approved Disinfectants) (Amendment) Order 1994 (S.I. 1994/2965)
 Bingo Duty (Exemptions) Order 1994 (S.I. 1994/2967)
 Finance Act 1993, section 4, (Appointed Day) Order 1994 (S.I. 1994/2968)
 Value Added Tax (Education) (No. 2) Order 1994 (S.I. 1994/2969)
 Merchant Shipping (Salvage and Pollution) Act 1994 (Commencement No. 2) Order 1994 (S.I. 1994/2971)
 Export of Goods (Control) (Croatian and Bosnian Territories) (Revocation) Order 1994 (S.I. 1994/2972)
 Industry-Wide Coal Staff Superannuation Scheme Regulations 1994 (S.I. 1994/2973)
 Industry-Wide Mineworkers' Pension Scheme Regulations 1994 (S.I. 1994/2974)
 Social Security (Medical Evidence) Amendment Regulations 1994 (S.I. 1994/2975)
 Retention of Registration Marks (Amendment) Regulations 1994 (S.I. 1994/2976)
 Sale of Registration Marks (Amendment) Regulations 1994 (S.I. 1994/2977)
 Suppression of Terrorism Act 1978 (Designation of Countries) Order 1994 (S.I. 1994/2978)
 Margaret Danyers College (Incorporation) Order 1994 (S.I. 1994/2979)
 Forms of Entry for Parental Orders Regulations 1994 (S.I. 1994/2981)
 Medicines (Veterinary Medicinal Products) (Veterinary Surgeons from Other EEA States) Regulations 1994 (S.I. 1994/2986)
 Medicines (Restrictions on the Administration of Veterinary Medicinal Products) Regulations 1994 (S.I. 1994/2987)
 Aintree Hospitals National Health Service Trust (Transfer of Trust Property) (No. 2) Order 1994 (S.I. 1994/2988)
 Hartlepool Community Care National Health Service Trust (Transfer of Trust Property) Order 1994 (S.I. 1994/2989)
 Hartlepool and Peterlee Hospitals National Health Service Trust (Transfer of Trust Property) Order 1994 (S.I. 1994/2990)
 South Lincolnshire Community and Mental Health Services National Health Service Trust (Transfer of Trust Property) Order 1994 (S.I. 1994/2991)
 Police (Amendment) (No. 4) Regulations 1994 (S.I. 1994/2993)
 Scottish Ambulance Service National Health Service Trust (Establishment) Order 1994 (S.I. 1994/2994)
 Glasgow Dental Hospital and School National Health Service Trust (Establishment) Order 1994 (S.I. 1994/2995)
 Argyll and Bute National Health Service Trust (Establishment) Order 1994 (S.I. 1994/2996)
 Borders Community Health Services National Health Service Trust (Establishment) Order 1994 (S.I. 1994/2997)
 Borders General Hospital National Health Service Trust (Establishment) Order 1994 (S.I. 1994/2998)
 Dumfries and Galloway Community Health National Health Service Trust (Establishment) Order 1994 (S.I. 1994/2999)
 Lanarkshire Healthcare National Health Service Trust (Establishment) Order 1994 (S.I. 1994/3000)

3001-3100

 Lomond Healthcare National Health Service Trust (Establishment) Order 1994 (S.I. 1994/3001)
 Farm and Conservation Grant (Variation) (No. 2) Scheme 1994 (S.I. 1994/3002)
 Farm and Conservation Grant (Amendment) Regulations 1994 (S.I. 1994/3003)
 A1 Trunk Road (Haringey) Red Route Traffic Order 1993 Variation Order 1994 (S.I. 1994/3004)
 A1 Trunk Road (Haringey) (Bus Lanes) Red Route Traffic Order 1993 Variation Order 1994 (S.I. 1994/3005)
 A1 Trunk Road (Islington) Red Route Traffic Order 1993 Variation Order 1994 (S.I. 1994/3006)
 A1 Trunk Road (Islington) (Bus Lanes) Red Route Traffic Order 1993 Variation Order 1994 (S.I. 1994/3007)
 Capital Gains Tax (Annual Exempt Amount) Order 1994 (S.I. 1994/3008)
 Retirement Benefits Schemes (Indexation of Earnings Cap) Order 1994 (S.I. 1994/3009)
 Income Tax (Cash Equivalents of Car Fuel Benefits) Order 1994 (S.I. 1994/3010)
 Inheritance Tax (Indexation) Order 1994 (S.I. 1994/3011)
 Income Tax (Indexation) Order 1994 (S.I. 1994/3012)
 Value Added Tax (Buildings and Land) Order 1994 (S.I. 1994/3013)
 Value Added Tax (Transport) Order 1994 (S.I. 1994/3014)
 Value Added Tax (General) (Amendment) Regulations 1994 (S.I. 1994/3015)
 Medicines (Products Other Than Veterinary Drugs) (Prescription Only) Amendment (No. 2) Order 1994 (S.I. 1994/3016)
 Medical Devices Regulations 1994 (S.I. 1994/3017)
 Accounts and Audit (Amendment) Regulations 1994 (S.I. 1994/3018)
 Electricity Supply (Amendment) (No. 2) Regulations 1994 (S.I. 1994/3021)
 Firearms (Amendment) Rules 1994 (S.I. 1994/3022)
 Charities Act 1992 (Commencement No. 2) Order 1994 (S.I. 1994/3023)
 Charitable Institutions (Fund-Raising) Regulations 1994 (S.I. 1994/3024)
 Local Government (Compensation for Redundancy) Regulations 1994 (S.I. 1994/3025)
 Local Government Superannuation (Amendment) Regulations 1994 (S.I. 1994/3026)
 Insurance Companies (Pension Business) (Transitional Provisions) (Amendment) Regulations 1994 (S.I. 1994/3036)
 Deregulation and Contracting Out Act 1994 (Commencement No. 1) Order 1994 (S.I. 1994/3037)
 National Health Service (Service Committees and Tribunal) (Scotland) Amendment Regulations 1994 (S.I. 1994/3038)
 Police (Special Constables) (Scotland) Amendment Regulations 1994 (S.I. 1994/3039)
 Rent Officers (Additional Functions) (Amendment No. 2) Order 1994 (S.I. 1994/3040)
 Excise Duty (Amendment of the Isle of Man Act 1979) Order 1994 (S.I. 1994/3041)
 Education (Fees and Awards) Regulations 1994 (S.I. 1994/3042)
 Education (Mandatory Awards) (Amendment) (No. 2) Regulations 1994 (S.I. 1994/3043)
 Education (Mandatory Awards) Regulations 1994 (S.I. 1994/3044)
 Education (Student Loans) Regulations 1994 (S.I. 1994/3045)
 Mental Health The Court of Protection Rules 1994 (S.I. 1994/3046)
 Court of Protection (Enduring Powers of Attorney) Rules 1994 (S.I. 1994/3047)
 Merchant Shipping (Liability of Shipowners and Others) (Rate of Interest) Order 1994 (S.I. 1994/3049)
 Medicines (Products Other Than Veterinary Drugs) (Prescription Only) Amendment (No. 3) Order 1994 (S.I. 1994/3050)
 Construction Products (Amendment) Regulations 1994 (S.I. 1994/3051)
 Water Byelaws (Loch an Sgoltaire) Extension S.I. 1994/3053)
 Local Government Changes for England (Non-Domestic Rating) (Contributions) Regulations 1994 (S.I. 1994/3054)
 Civil Aviation (Joint Financing) Regulations 1994 (S.I. 1994/3055)
 Cambridgeshire County Council (River Nene B1040 Dog–In–A–Doublet Bridge) Scheme 1994 Confirmation Instrument 1994 (S.I. 1994/3056)
 Income-related Benefits Schemes (Miscellaneous Amendments) (No. 6) Regulations 1994 (S.I. 1994/3061)
 Doncaster Area Drainage Act 1929 (Amendment) Order 1994 (S.I. 1994/3062)
 Coal Industry Act 1994 (Commencement No. 3) Order 1994 (S.I. 1994/3063)
 Coal Mining Subsidence (Land Drainage) Regulations 1994 (S.I. 1994/3064)
 Aire and Calder Navigation Act 1992 (Amendment) Order 1994 (S.I. 1994/3065)
 Act of Sederunt (Copyright, Designs and Patents) (Amendment) 1994 (S.I. 1994/3066)
 Environmentally Sensitive Areas (Scotland) Orders Amendment Order 1994 (S.I. 1994/3067)
 Local Government (Compensation for Redundancy) (Scotland) Regulations 1994 (S.I. 1994/3068)
 Insurance Brokers Registration Council (Registration and Enrolment) (Amendment) Rules Approval Order 1994 (S.I. 1994/3069)
 Coal Industry (Protected Persons) Pensions Regulations 1994 (S.I. 1994/3070)
 Civil Aviation (Route Charges for Navigation Services) Regulations 1994 (S.I. 1994/3071)
 Police and Magistrates' Courts Act 1994 (Commencement No. 4 and Transitional Provisions) (Scotland) Order 1994 (S.I. 1994/3075)
 Energy Information (Refrigerators and Freezers) Regulations 1994 (S.I. 1994/3076)
 Education (London Residuary Body) (Property Transfer) (Amendment) Order 1994 (S.I. 1994/3078)
 District Probate Registries (Amendment No. 2) Order 1994 (S.I. 1994/3079)
 Electromagnetic Compatibility (Amendment) Regulations 1994 (S.I. 1994/3080)
 Coal Industry Act 1994 (Consequential Modifications of Local Acts) Order 1994 (S.I. 1994/3081)
 Meat Products (Hygiene) Regulations 1994 (S.I. 1994/3082)
 Boiler (Efficiency) (Amendment) Regulations 1994 (S.I. 1994/3083)
 Local Government Act 1988 (Defined Activities) (Exemption) (Livingston Development Corporation) Order 1994 (S.I. 1994/3084)
 Set-Aside Access (Scotland) Regulations 1994 (S.I. 1994/3085)
 Act of Sederunt (Proceedings in the Sheriff Court under the Debtors (Scotland) Act 1987) (Amendment) 1994 (S.I. 1994/3086)
 Treatment of Spruce Bark (Amendment) Order 1994 (S.I. 1994/3093)
 Plant Health (Forestry) (Great Britain) (Amendment) Order 1994 (S.I. 1994/3094)
 Vehicle Licences (Duration of First Licences and Rate of Duty) (Amendment) Order 1994 (S.I. 1994/3095)
 Highlands and Islands Agricultural Programme Regulations 1994 (S.I. 1994/3096)
 Opencast Coal (Compulsory Rights, Drainage and Rights of Way) (Forms) Regulations 1994 (S.I. 1994/3097)
 Simple Pressure Vessels (Safety) (Amendment) Regulations 1994 (S.I. 1994/3098)
 Habitat (Broadleaved Woodland) (Wales) Regulations 1994 (S.I. 1994/3099)
 Habitat (Water Fringe) (Wales) Regulations 1994 (S.I. 1994/3100)

3101-3200

 Habitat (Coastal Belt) (Wales) Regulations 1994 (S.I. 1994/3101)
 Habitat (Species-Rich Grassland) (Wales) Regulations 1994 (S.I. 1994/3102)
 Licensing (Fees) (Amendment) Order 1994 (S.I. 1994/3103)
 London Residuary Body (Pits at Stone) Order 1994 (S.I. 1994/3104)
 Education, (London Residuary Body) (Property Transfer) (Amendment) (No. 2) Order 1994 (S.I. 1994/3105)
 Education (University Commissioners) Order 1994 (S.I. 1994/3106)
 Local Government Act 1988 (Supervision of Parking) (Exemption) (Scotland) Order 1994 (S.I. 1994/3107)
 Rent Officers (Additional Functions) (Scotland) Amendment (No.2) Order 1994 (S.I. 1994/3108)
 Local Government Changes for England (Collection Fund Surpluses and Deficits) Regulations 1994 (S.I. 1994/3115)
 Marriage Act 1994 (Commencement No. 1) Order 1994 (S.I. 1994/3116)
 Motor Vehicle Tyres (Safety) Regulations 1994 (S.I. 1994/3117)
 Church Representation Rules (Amendment) Resolution 1994 (S.I. 1994/3118)
 Medical Devices (Consequential Amendments—Medicines) Regulations 1994 (S.I. 1994/3119)
 Medicines (Committee on Dental and Surgical Materials) (Revocation) Order 1994 (S.I. 1994/3120)
 Central Rating Lists Regulations 1994 (S.I. 1994/3121)
 Non-Domestic Rating (Miscellaneous Provisions) (No. 2) (Amendment) Regulations 1994 (S.I. 1994/3122)
 Non-Domestic Rating (Railways, Telecommunications and Canals) Regulations 1994 (S.I. 1994/3123)
 Local Government Reorganisation (Wales) (Transitional Provisions) Order 1994 (S.I. 1994/3124)
 Non-Domestic Rating Contributions (Wales) (Amendment) (No. 3) Regulations 1994 (S.I. 1994/3125)
 Value Added Tax (Means of Transport) Order 1994 (S.I. 1994/3128)
 Telecommunications Terminal Equipment (Amendment and Extension) Regulations 1994 (S.I. 1994/3129)
 Vocational Training for General Medical Practice (European Requirements) Regulations 1994 (S.I. 1994/3130)
 Beef Special Premium (Amendment) Regulations 1994 (S.I. 1994/3131)
 Insurance Companies (Amendment) Regulations 1994 (S.I. 1994/3132)
 Insurance Companies (Amendment No. 2) Regulations 1994 (S.I. 1994/3133)
 A69 Trunk Road (Haltwhistle Bypass) Order 1994 (S.I. 1994/3134)
 A69 Trunk Road (Haltwhistle Town) (De-Trunking) Order 1994 (S.I. 1994/3135)
 Legal Aid in Criminal and Care Proceedings (General) (Amendment) (No. 2) Regulations 1994 (S.I. 1994/3136)
 Children (Allocation of Proceedings) (Amendment) (No. 2) Order 1994 (S.I. 1994/3138)
 Non-Domestic Rating Contributions (England) (Amendment No. 3) Regulations 1994 (S.I. 1994/3139)
 Construction (Design and Management) Regulations 1994 (S.I. 1994/3140)
 Diseases of Poultry Order 1994 (S.I. 1994/3141)
 Marketing Authorisations for Veterinary Medicinal Products Regulations 1994 (S.I. 1994/3142)
 Medicines (Veterinary Drugs) (Renewal Applications for Licences and Animal Test Certificates) Regulations 1994 (S.I. 1994/3143)
 Medicines for Human Use (Marketing Authorisations Etc.) Regulations 1994 (S.I. 1994/3144)
 Non-Domestic Rating Contributions (Scotland) Amendment Regulations 1994 (S.I. 1994/3146)
 Parental Order Register (Form of Entry) (Scotland) Regulations 1994 (S.I. 1994/3147)
 Education (European Community Enlargement) (Scotland) Regulations 1994 (S.I. 1994/3148)
 Self-Governing Schools (Suspension of Proposals) (Scotland) Order 1994 (S.I. 1994/3149)
 Local Government etc. (Scotland) Act 1994 (Commencement No. 2) Order 1994 (S.I. 1994/3150)
 Registration of Births, Still-births, Deaths and Marriages (Prescription of Forms) (Scotland) Amendment Regulations 1994 (S.I. 1994/3151)
 Local Government Finance Act 1992 (Commencement No. 9 and Transitional Provision) Order 1994 (S.I. 1994/3152)
 Crown Court (Amendment) (No. 2) Rules 1994 (S.I. 1994/3153)
 Magistrates' Courts (Miscellaneous Amendments) Rules 1994 (S.I. 1994/3154)
 Family Proceedings (Amendment) (No. 4) Rules 1994 (S.I. 1994/3155)
 Family Proceedings Courts (Children Act 1989) (Amendment (No.2) Rules 1994 (S.I. 1994/3156)
 Parental Responsibility Agreement (Amendment) Regulations 1994 (S.I. 1994/3157)
 Severn Bridges Tolls Order 1994 (S.I. 1994/3158)
 Unfair Terms in Consumer Contracts Regulations 1994 (S.I. 1994/3159)
 Local Government Act 1988 (Defined Activities) (Exemption) (Hastings Borough Council, Worthing Borough Council and Barnet London Borough Council) Order 1994 (S.I. 1994/3161)
 Gloucester Harbour Revision Order 1994 (S.I. 1994/3162)
 Telecommunication Meters (Approval Fees) (BABT) (Amendment) Order 1994 (S.I. 1994/3163)
 Local Government Act 1988 (Competition) (Legal Services) (England) Regulations 1994 (S.I. 1994/3164)
 Local Government Act 1988 (Defined Activities) (Competition) (Supervision of Parking, Management of Vehicles and Security Work) (England) Regulations 1994 (S.I. 1994/3165)
 Local Government Act 1988 (Competition) (Construction and Property Services) (England) Regulations 1994 (S.I. 1994/3166)
 Local Government Changes for England (Direct Labour and Service Organisations) Regulations 1994 (S.I. 1994/3167)
 Ogwr (Ogmore Valley and Garw Valley Communities) Order 1994 (S.I. 1994/3168)
 Medicines (Veterinary Drugs) (Pharmacy and Merchants' List) (Amendment No. 2) Order 1994 (S.I. 1994/3169)
 Council Tax (Reduction of Liability) (Scotland) Regulations 1994 (S.I. 1994/3170)
 General Medical Council (Constitution of Fitness to Practise Committees) (Amendment No. 2) Rules Order of Council 1994 (S.I. 1994/3171)
 Broadcasting (Unlicensed Television Services) Exemption Order 1994 (S.I. 1994/3172)
 Bournewood Community and Mental Health National Health Service Trust (Establishment) Order 1994 (S.I. 1994/3173)
 Manchester Children's Hospitals National Health Service Trust (Establishment) Order 1994 (S.I. 1994/3174)
 Grantham and District Hospital National Health Service Trust (Establishment) Order 1994 (S.I. 1994/3175)
 Sussex Ambulance Service National Health Service Trust (Establishment) Order 1994 (S.I. 1994/3176)
 Black Country Mental Health National Health Service Trust (Establishment) Order 1994 (S.I. 1994/3177)
 Pathfinder National Health Service Trust (Establishment) Order 1994 (S.I. 1994/3178)
 Princess Alexandra Hospital National Health Service Trust (Establishment) Order 1994 (S.I. 1994/3179)
 Essex and Herts Community National Health Service Trust (Establishment) Order 1994 (S.I. 1994/3180)
 Homerton Hospital National Health Service Trust(Establishment) Order 1994 (S.I. 1994/3181)
 Birmingham Children's Hospital National Health Service Trust (Establishment) Order 1994 (S.I. 1994/3182)
 St. James's and Seacroft University Hospitals National Health Service Trust (Establishment) Order 1994 (S.I. 1994/3183)
 Royal Liverpool and Broadgreen University Hospitals National Health Service Trust (Establishment) Order 1994 (S.I. 1994/3184)
 Fosse Health, Leicestershire Community National Health Service Trust (Establishment) Order 1994 (S.I. 1994/3185)
 United Leeds Teaching Hospitals National Health Service Trust (Establishment) Order 1994 (S.I. 1994/3186)
 Air Navigation (Dangerous Goods) Regulations 1994 (S.I. 1994/3187)
 Deregulation and Contracting Out Act 1994 (Commencement No. 2) Order 1994 (S.I. 1994/3188)
 Local Government Act 1988 (Defined Activities) (Exemption) (South Norfolk District Council) Order 1994 (S.I. 1994/3189)
 Local Government Act 1988 (Defined Activities) (Exemption) (Southwark London Borough Council) Order 1994 (S.I. 1994/3190)
 Criminal Justice Act 1991 (Commencement No. 4) Order 1994 (S.I. 1994/3191)
 Criminal Justice and Public Order Act 1994 (Commencement No. 2) Order 1994 (S.I. 1994/3192)
 Criminal Justice Act 1991 (Suspension of Prisoner Custody Officer Certificate) (Amendment) Regulations 1994 (S.I. 1994/3193)
 Young Offender Institution (Amendment) Rules 1994 (S.I. 1994/3194)
 Prison (Amendment) Rules 1994 (S.I. 1994/3195)
 Social Security (Claims and Payments) Amendment (No. 4) Regulations 1994 (S.I. 1994/3196)
 Wolverhampton Health Care National Health Service Trust (Establishment) Order 1994 (S.I. 1994/3197)
 Firearms (Scotland) Amendment Rules 1994 (S.I. 1994/3198)
 Valuation for Rating (Plant and Machinery) (Scotland) Regulations 1994 (S.I. 1994/3199)
 Non-Domestic Rating (Unoccupied Property) (Scotland) Regulations 1994 (S.I. 1994/3200)

3201-3300

 Child Abduction and Custody (Parties to Conventions) (Amendment) (No. 6) Order 1994 (S.I. 1994/3201)
 Consular Fees (Amendment) Order 1994 (S.I. 1994/3202)
 European Convention on Extradition (Amendment) Order 1994 (S.I. 1994/3203)
 Firearms (Amendment) (Northern Ireland) Order 1994 (S.I. 1994/3204)
 Food and Environment Protection Act 1985 (Isle of Man) (Revocation) Order 1994 (S.I. 1994/3205)
 Ministerial and other Salaries Order 1994 (S.I. 1994/3206)
 Double Taxation Relief (Taxes on Income) (Estonia) Order 1994 (S.I. 1994/3207)
 Double Taxation Relief (Taxes on Income) (Isle of Man) Order 1994 (S.I. 1994/3208)
 Double Taxation Relief (Taxes on Income) (Guernsey) Order 1994 (S.I. 1994/3209)
 Double Taxation Relief (Taxes on Income) (Jersey) Order 1994 (S.I. 1994/3210)
 Double Taxation Relief (Taxes on Income) (Kazakhstan) Order 1994 (S.I. 1994/3211)
 Double Taxation Relief (Taxes on Income) (Mexico) Order 1994 (S.I. 1994/3212)
 Double Taxation Relief (Taxes on Income) (Russian Federation) Order 1994 (S.I. 1994/3213)
 Double Taxation Relief (Taxes on Estates of Deceased Persons and Inheritances) (Switzerland) Order 1994 (S.I. 1994/3214)
 Double Taxation Relief (Taxes on Income) (Switzerland) Order 1994 (S.I. 1994/3215)
 Double Taxation Relief (Taxes on Income) (Vietnam) Order 1994 (S.I. 1994/3216)
 Maximum Number of Judges Order 1994 (S.I. 1994/3217)
 European Convention on Cinematographic Co-production (Amendment) (No. 2) Order 1994 (S.I. 1994/3218)
 Designs (Convention Countries) Order 1994 (S.I. 1994/3219)
 Patents (Convention Countries) Order 1994 (S.I. 1994/3220)
 Local Government Superannuation (Local Government Reorganisation in England) Regulations 1994 (S.I. 1994/3221)
 Films Co-Production Agreements (Amendment) Order 1994 (S.I. 1994/3222)
 Local Government Changes for England (Finance, Miscellaneous Provisions) Regulations 1994 (S.I. 1994/3223)
 Finance Act 1993, section 165, (Appointed Day) Order 1994 (S.I. 1994/3224)
 Finance Act 1994, Chapter II of Part IV, (Appointed Day) Order 1994 (S.I. 1994/3225)
 Exchange Gains and Losses (Transitional Provisions) Regulations 1994 (S.I. 1994/3226)
 Exchange Gains and Losses (Alternative Method of Calculation of Gain or Loss) Regulations 1994 (S.I. 1994/3227)
 Exchange Gains and Losses (Deferral of Gains and Losses) Regulations 1994 (S.I. 1994/3228)
 Exchange Gains and Losses (Excess Gains and Losses) Regulations 1994 (S.I. 1994/3229)
 Local Currency Elections Regulations 1994 (S.I. 1994/3230)
 Exchange Gains and Losses (Insurance Companies) Regulations 1994 (S.I. 1994/3231)
 Exchange Gains and Losses (Debts of Varying Amounts) Regulations 1994 (S.I. 1994/3232)
 Currency Contracts and Options (Amendment of Enactments) Order 1994 (S.I. 1994/3233)
 Environmental Protection Act 1990 (Commencement No. 15) (Amendment No. 2) Order 1994 (S.I. 1994/3234)
 Merchant Shipping (Reporting Requirements for Ships Carrying Dangerous or Polluting Goods) Regulations 1994 (S.I. 1994/3245)
 Control of Substances Hazardous to Health Regulations 1994 (S.I. 1994/3246)
 Chemicals (Hazard Information and Packaging for Supply) Regulations 1994 (S.I. 1994/3247)
 Price Indications (Resale of Tickets) Regulations 1994 (S.I. 1994/3248)
 Welfare of Animals during Transport Order 1994 (S.I. 1994/3249)
 Magistrates' Courts Fees (Amendment) Order 1994 (S.I. 1994/3250)
 Education (Inter-authority Recoupment) Regulations 1994 (S.I. 1994/3251)
 Local Authorities (Recognised Bodies for Heritable Securities Indemnities) (Scotland) Amendment Order 1994 (S.I. 1994/3253)
 National Health Service Trusts (Appointment of Trustees) (Scotland) (No.2) Order 1994 (S.I. 1994/3254)
 Local Government (Transitional Election Arrangements) (Scotland) Order 1994 (S.I. 1994/3255)
 Valuation for Rating (Decapitalisation Rate) (Scotland) Regulations 1994 (S.I. 1994/3256)
 Registration of Births, Deaths and Marriages (Fees) Order 1994 (S.I. 1994/3257)
 Criminal Justice and Public Order Act 1994 (Commencement No. 3) Order 1994 (S.I. 1994/3258)
 Electricity (Non-Fossil Fuel Sources) (England and Wales) Order 1994 (S.I. 1994/3259)
 Electrical Equipment (Safety) Regulations 1994 (S.I. 1994/3260)
 Police and Magistrates' Courts Act 1994 (Commencement No. 5 and Transitional Provisions) Order 1994 (S.I. 1994/3262)
 Highways (Inquiries Procedure) Rules 1994 (S.I. 1994/3263)
 Compulsory Purchase by Ministers (Inquiries Procedure) Rules 1994  S.I. 1994/3264)
 Court of Session etc. Fees Amendment Order 1994 (S.I. 1994/3265)
 High Court of Justiciary Fees Amendment Order 1994 (S.I. 1994/3266)
 Act of Sederunt (Fees of Sheriff Officers) (No.2) 1994 (S.I. 1994/3267)
 Act of Sederunt (Fees of Messengers-at-Arms) (No.2) 1994 (S.I. 1994/3268)
 Town and Country Planning (Fees for Applications and Deemed Applications) (Scotland) Amendment Regulations 1994 (S.I. 1994/3269)
 Road Vehicles (Construction and Use) (Amendment) (No.3) Regulations 1994 (S.I. 1994/3270)
 Public Service Vehicles (Registration of Local Services) (Amendment) Regulations 1994 (S.I. 1994/3271)
 Public Service Vehicles (Traffic Regulation Conditions) (Amendment) Regulations 1994 (S.I. 1994/3272)
 Sole and Nephrops (Prohibition of Fishing) Order 1994 (S.I. 1994/3273)
 Electricity (Non-Fossil Fuel Sources) (Scotland) Order 1994 (S.I. 1994/3275)
 Sex Discrimination Act 1975 (Application to Armed Forces etc.) Regulations 1994 (S.I. 1994/3276)
 National Savings Stock Register (Amendment) Regulations 1994 (S.I. 1994/3277)
 Overseas Life Assurance Fund (Amendment) Order 1994 (S.I. 1994/3278)
 Non-Domestic Rating (Chargeable Amounts) Regulations 1994 (S.I. 1994/3279)
 Docks and Harbours (Rateable Values) (Amendment) Order 1994 (S.I. 1994/3280)
 British Waterways Board and Telecommunications Industry (Rateable Values) Revocation Order 1994 (S.I. 1994/3281)
 Electricity Supply Industry (Rateable Values) Order 1994 (S.I. 1994/3282)
 British Gas plc (Rateable Values) Order 1994 (S.I. 1994/3283)
 Railways (Rateable Values) Order 1994 (S.I. 1994/3284)
 Water Undertakers (Rateable Values) Order 1994 (S.I. 1994/3285)
 Channel Tunnel (Sunday Trading Act 1994) (Disapplication) Order 1994 (S.I. 1994/3286)
 Planning and Compensation Act 1991 (Commencement No. 17 and Transitional Provision) (Scotland) Order 1994 (S.I. 1994/3292)
 Town and Country Planning (General Development Procedure) (Scotland) Amendment (No.2) Order 1994 (S.I. 1994/3293)
 Town and Country Planning (General Permitted Development) (Scotland) Amendment (No.3) Order 1994 (S.I. 1994/3294)
 Road Vehicles (Registration and Licensing) (Amendment) (No. 3) Regulations 1994 (S.I. 1994/3296)
 Road Vehicles (Registration and Licensing) (Amendment) (No. 2) Regulations (Northern Ireland) 1994 (S.I. 1994/3297)
 General Medical Council Preliminary Proceedings Committee and Professional Conduct Committee (Procedure) (Amendment) Rules Order of Council 1994 (S.I. 1994/3298)

3301-3400

 Employers' Liability (Compulsory Insurance) General (Amendment) Regulations 1994 (S.I. 1994/3301)
 North West Sutherland Protection Order 1994 (S.I. 1994/3302)
 Legal Advice and Assistance at Police Stations (Remuneration) (Amendment) (No.2) Regulations 1994 (S.I. 1994/3303)
 A630 Trunk Road (Doncaster) (Detrunking) Order 1994 (S.I. 1994/3307)
 Strathclyde Regional Council (Loch Assapol) Water Order 1994 (S.I. 1994/3308)
 Strathclyde Regional Council (the Ayr Burgh Act 1885) (Amendment) Water Order 1994 (S.I. 1994/3309)
 Combined Probation Areas (Derbyshire) Order 1994 (S.I. 1994/3313)
 Combined Probation Areas (Hertfordshire) Order 1994 (S.I. 1994/3314)
 Combined Probation Areas (Suffolk) Order 1994 (S.I. 1994/3315)
 General Optical Council (Maximum Penalty) Order of Council 1994 (S.I. 1994/3327)

External links
Legislation.gov.uk delivered by the UK National Archive
UK SI's on legislation.gov.uk
UK Draft SI's on legislation.gov.uk

See also
List of Statutory Instruments of the United Kingdom

Lists of Statutory Instruments of the United Kingdom
Statutory Instruments